= List of churches in the Diocese of Brooklyn =

This is a list of current and former Catholic churches in the Diocese of Brooklyn. The diocese covers the New York City boroughs of Brooklyn and Queens. Churches in the rest of New York City (Manhattan, Staten Island and the Bronx) are part of the Archdiocese of New York.; see the List of churches in the Roman Catholic Archdiocese of New York.

The diocesan cathedral is the Cathedral Basilica of St. James in Downtown Brooklyn and its co-cathedral is the Co-Cathedral of St. Joseph in Prospect Heights.

== Brooklyn churches ==
Name of church or parish	Image	Location	Description/Notes
All Saints Church		115 Throop Ave, Williamsburg	Founded in 1866 as a German parish. Current church dedicated in 1894.
Basilica of Our Lady of Perpetual Help		526 59th St, Sunset Park	Church completed in 1928, declared a minor basilica in 1969.
Basilica of Regina Pacis		1230 65th St, Bensonhurst	Constructed in 1905, declared minor basilica in 2012.
Blessed Sacrament-St. Sylvester Parish		Blessed Sacrament Church, 198 Euclid Ave, Cypress Hills	Combined with St. Sylvester
		St. Sylvester Church, 416 Grant Ave, City Line	Combined with Blessed Sacrament
Brooklyn Oratory Parishes		St. Boniface Church, 190 Duffield St, Downtown	Operated by the Oratory of Saint Philip Neri.
		Assumption of the Blessed Virgin Mary Church, 55 Cranberry St, Brooklyn Heights	Operated by the Oratory of Saint Philip Neri.
Cathedral Basilica of St. James		250 Cathedral Pl, Downtown	Cathedral of the Diocese of Brooklyn. Constructed in 1903.
Co-Cathedral of St. Joseph/St. Theresa of Avila Parish		St. Joseph, 856 Pacific St, Prospect Heights	Co-Cathedral of the Diocese of Brooklyn. Constructed in 1912. Combined with St. Theresa.
		St. Theresa of Avila Church, 563 Sterling Pl, Prospect Heights	Combined with St. Joseph
Divine Mercy Parish		St. Cecilia Church, 84 Herbert St, Greenpoint	Combined into Divine Mercy Parish.
		St. Nicholas Church, 26 Olive St, Williamsburg	Combined into Divine Mercy Parish.
		St. Francis of Paola Church, 219 Conselyea St, Williamsburg	Combined into Divine Mercy Parish.
Good Shepherd - Resurrection Parish		Good Shepherd Church, 1950 Batchelder St, Madison	Combined with Resurrection.
		Resurrection Church, 2331 Gerritsen Ave, Sheepshead Bay	Constructed in 1953. Combined with Good Shepherd
Holy Family-St. Thomas Aquinas Church		249 9th Street, Park Slope	
Holy Innocents Church		279 E. 17th St, Flatbush	Constructed in 1923, Added to NRHP in 2007.
Holy Name of Jesus Church		245 Prospect Park West, South Slope	Constructed in 1878.
Immaculate Heart of Mary Church		2805 Fort Hamilton Pkwy, Windsor Terrace	Founded in 1893, church dedicated in 1931
Mary of Nazareth Parish		Sacred Heart Church, 32 Clermont Ave, Fort Greene	Now part of Mary of Nazareth.
Most Holy Trinity Church–St. Mary Parish		Most Holy Trinity Church, 138 Montrose Ave, Williamsburg	Most Holy Trinity Founded in 1841 as the first German parish in Brooklyn. Combined with St. Mary in 2007.
Most Precious Blood/Saints Simon and Jude Parish		Saints Simon and Jude Church, 185 Van Sicklen St, Gravesend	Combined with Most Precious
		Most Precious Blood Church, 70 Bay 47th St, Gravesend	Combined with Saints Simon and Jude
Our Lady of Consolation Church		184 Metropolitan Ave, Williamsburg	Polish-language church
Our Lady of Częstochowa and St Casimir Church		183 25th St, Sunset Park	Constructed in 1904, merged with St. Casimir in 1980. Polish national church.
Our Lady of Grace Church		430 Ave W, Gravesend	Constructed in 1936.
Our Lady of Mount Carmel/Annunciation Parish		Our Lady of Carmel Church, 275 N. 8th St, Williamsburg	Combined with Annunciation.
		Annunciation of the Blessed Virgin Mary Church, 259 N. 5th St, Williamsburg	Built in 1863, Lithuanian national church since 1914. Combined with Our Lady.
Our Lady of Refuge Church		2020 Foster Ave, Flatbush	Constructed in 1913.
Queen of All Saints Church		300 Vanderbilt Ave, Fort Greene	Constructed in 1914.
Sacred Hearts and St. Stephen Church		25 Summit St, Carrol Gardens	St. Stephen was built in 1875 and Sacred Hearts in 1885. Merged in 1941, Sacred Hearts was razed for a highway.
Shrine Church of Our Lady of Solace		2866 W 17th St, Coney Island	Constructed in 1900.
Shrine Church of St. Bernadette		8201 13th Ave, Dyker Heights	Founded in 1935
St. Agatha Church		702 48th St, Sunset Park	Founded in 1912
St. Andrew the Apostle Church		6713 Ridge Blvd, Bay Ridge	Built in 1981.
St. Anthony-St. Alphonsus Church		862 Manhattan Ave, Greenpoint	St. Anthony was constructed in 1874, Combined with St. Alphonsus in 1975.
St. Athanasius- St. Dominic Parish		St. Athanasius Church, 2154 61st St, Bensonhurst	Founded in 1913, current church built in 1962. Combined with St. Dominic
		St. Dominic Church, 2001 Bay Ridge Pkwy, Bensonhurst	Combined with St. Athanasius
St. Augustine-St. Francis Xavier Parish		Saint Augustine Church, 122 Sixth Ave, Park Slope	Built in 1897
		St. Francis Xavier Church, 225 6th Ave, Park Slope	Built in 1904. Filming location for John Wick.
St. Barbara Church		138 Bleecker St, Bushwick	Founding 1894 as a German parish. Current church built in 1910; Spanish Baroque Revival
St. Bernard Clairvaux Church		2044 E 69th St, Mill Basin	Founded in 1961, current church built in 1964
St. Brendan Church		1525 E 12th St, Midwood	Founded in 1907, church dedicated in 1920.
St Catharine of Alexandria Church		1119 41st St, Borough Park	Founded in 1902
St. Catharine of Genoa		520 Linden Blvd, Jamaica	Established in 1911.
St. Charles Borromeo Church		19 Sidney Pl, Brooklyn Heights	Built in 1869.
St. Columba Church		2245 Kimball St, Marine Park	
SS. Cyril and Methodius Parish		150 Dupont St, Greenpoint	
St. Edmund Church		1902 Avenue T, Homecrest	
St. Ephram Church		929 Bay Ridge Pkwy, Dyker Heights	Founded in 1921, current church dedicated in 1953
St. Finbar Church		138 Bay 20th St, Bath Beach	Founded in 1880, current church dedicated in 1912
St. Fortunata Church		2609 Linden Blvd.	
St. Frances Cabrini Church		1562 86 St, Bensonhurst	Opened in 1963.
St. Francis de Chantal Church		1273 58th St, Borough Park	Founded in 1892, current church started in 1910
St. Francis of Assisi -St. Blaise Church		319 Maple St, Flatbush	Current building finished in 1913. The two churches merged in 1980. Operated by the Society of Mary.
St. John the Evangelist/St. Rocco Parish		St. John the Evangelist Church, 250 21st St, South Slope	St. John founded in 1846, St. Rocco in 1902. Churches merged in 2011.
St. Mark-St. Margaret Mary Parish		St. Margaret Mary Church, 15 Exeter St, Manhattan Beach	Combined with St. Mark
		St. Mark Church, 2609 E 19th St, Sheepshead Bay	Constructed in 1931. Combined with St. Margaret Mary.
St. Martin de Porres Parish		Our Lady of Victory Church, 583 Throop Ave, Bedford–Stuyvesant	Built between 1891 and 1895; Combined in one parish.
St. Mary Star of the Sea Church		467 Court St, Carroll Gardens	Constructed in 1855.
St. Matthew Parish		St. Gregory the Great Church, 224 Brooklyn Ave, Flatbush	Combined in St. Matthew.
		Our Lady of Charity Church, 1669 Dean St, Brownsville	Combined in St. Matthew.
		St. Matthew Church, 1123 Eastern Pkwy, Crown Heights	Combined with Our Lady and St. Gregory.
St. Michael-St. Malachy Parish		225 Jerome St, East New York	Constructed in 1854. Combined with St. Michael
St. Michael Church		352 42nd St, Sunset Park	Constructed in 1905, Byzantine Revival.
St. Paul and St. Agnes Parish		St. Paul Church, 234 Congress St, Cobble Hill	Combined with St. Agnes.
		St. Agnes Church, 433 Sackett St, Carroll Gardens	Combined with St. Paul
St. Peter and Paul Church		71 South 3rd St, Williamsburg	Founded in 1844
St. Rose of Lima Church		269 Parkville Ave, Flatbush	Founded in 1870, current church dedicated in 1925
St. Saviour Church		611 Eighth Ave, Park Slope	Founded in 1905, church dedicated in 1906.
St. Thomas Aquinas Church		249 Ninth St, Park Slope	Constructed in 1930.
St. Vincent Ferrer Church		925 E 37th St, East Flatbush	Constructed in 1932.
Visitation of the Blessed Virgin Mary Church		98 Richards St, Red Hook	Founded in 1854, current church dedicated around 1896

== Queens churches ==
Name of church or parish	Image	Location	Description/Notes
Ascension Church		86-13 55 Ave, Elmhurst	Constructed in 1938.
Blessed Sacrament Church		34-43 93rd St, Jackson Heights	
Christ the King Church		145-39 Farmers Blvd, Springfield Gardens	Founded in 1934, church dedicated in 1935
Corpus Christi Church		31-30 61 St, Woodside	Constructed in 1940.
Holy Child Jesus -Saint Benedict Joseph Labre Parish		Saint Benedict Joseph Labre Church, 94-40 118th St, Richmond Hill	Built in 1919. Combined in 2020 with Holy Child.
		Holy Child Jesus Church, 111-11 86th Ave	Founded in 1910. Combined in 2020 with Saint Benedict.
Holy Cross Church		61-21 56th Rd, Maspeth	Built in 1913, Polish national church.
Holy Family-St. Laurence Parish		Holy Family Church, 9719 Flatlands Ave	Combined with St. Laurence.
		St. Laurence Church. 12265 Flatlands Ave	Combined with Holy Family.
Holy Trinity Church		14-51 143 St, Whitestone	
Immaculate Conception Church		Immaculate Conception Church, 21-47 29th St, Astoria	Founded in 1824, church constructed in 1951.
Parish of Incarnation-St. Gerald Majella		Incarnation Church, 89-43 Francis Lewis Blvd, Queens Village	Combined with St. Gerald
		Shrine Church of St. Gerald Majella, 188-16 91st Ave, Hollis	Combined with Incarnation
Mary's Nativity & St. Ann Parish		Church of Mary's Nativity, 46-02 Parsons Blvd, Flushing	Dedicated in 1965. Combined in one parish.
		St. Ann Church, 142-30 58th Ave, Flushing	Combined in one parish.
		St. Peter Claver Church, 29 Claver Pl	Combined in one parish.
		Holy Rosary Church, 139 Chauncey St.	Combined in one parish.
Most Precious Blood Church		32-23 36 St, Long Island City	
Nativity of the Blessed Virgin and St. Stanislaus Bishop and Martyr Parish		Nativity of the Blessed Virgin Church, 101-41 91st St, Ozone Park	Combined with St. Stanislaus.
		St. Stanislaus Bishop and Martyr Church, 88-1 102nd Ave, Ozone Park	Combined with Nativity.
Our Lady of Fatima Church		25-02 80th St, East Elmhurst	
Our Lady of Hope Church		61-21 71 St, Middle Village	
Our Lady of Grace Church		100-05 159 Ave, Howard Beach	Founded as a mission church in 1906, church dedicated in 1921, became a parish in 1924
Our Lady of Light Parish		St. Catharine of Siena Church, 118-22 Riverton Street, St. Albans	Combined with St. Pascal.
		St. Pascal Baylon Church, 11243 198th St, Jamaica	Combined with St. Catharine.
Our Lady of Lourdes Church		92-80 220 St. Queens Village	Constructed in 1955.
Our Lady of Mercy Church		70-01 Kessel St, Forest Hills	Constructed in 1937.
Our Lady of Miracles Church		757 East 86th St.	
Our Lady of Mount Carmel Church		23-25 Newtown Ave, Astoria	Mother church of Queens, constructed in 1873.
Our Lady of Perpetual Help Church		111-50 115 St, South Ozone Park	
Our Lady Queen of Martyrs Church		110-06 Queens Blvd, Forest Hills	Constructed in 1939.
Our Lady of Sorrows Church		104-11 37th Ave, Corona	Established in 1872.
Our Lady of the Angelus Church		63-63 98 St, Rego Park	
Our Lady of the Cenacle		136-06 87 Ave, Richmond Hill	
Our Lady of the Miraculous Medal Church		62-81 60th Pl, Ridgewood	
Our Lady of the Skies Chapel		JFK International Airport, Terminal 4, 4th Floor, Jamaica	Founded in 1955.
Presentation of the Blessed Virgin Mary Church		88-19 Parsons Blvd, Jamaica	
Queen of Angels Church		44-04 Skillman Ave, Sunnyside	
Queen of Peace Church		141-36 77th Ave, Flushing	
Resurrection-Ascension Church		61-11 85 St, Rego Park	
Shrine Church of St. Gerald Majella		188-16 91 Ave, Hollis	
St. Adalbert Church		52-29 83rd St, Elmhurst	Constructed in 1949, oldest Polish parish in Queens.
St. Aloysius Church		382 Onderdonk Ave, Ridgewood	
St. Andrew Avellino Church		35-60 158th St, Flushing	Constructed in 1940.
St. Bartholomew		43-22 Ithaca St, Elmhurst	Constructed in 1930.
St. Bonaventure-St. Benedict the Moor Parish		St. Bonaventure Church, 11458 170th St	Combined with St. Benedict.
		St. Benedict the Moor Church, 17117 110th Ave, Jamaica	Combined with St. Bonaventure.
St. Camillus-St. Virgillus Parish		St. Camillus Church, 99-15 Rockaway Beach Blvd, Rockaway Park	Combined with St. Virgillus in 2008.
		St. Virgillus Church, 16 Noel Rd	Constructed in 1926, combined with St. Camillus in 2008.
St. Clare Church		137-35 Brookville Blvd, Rosedale	Constructed in 1927
St. Clement Pope Church		141-11 123rd Ave, South Ozone Park	Founded in 1908
St. Elizabeth Church		94-20 85 St, Ozone Park	
St. Fidelis Church		123-06 14 Avenue, College Point	Founded in 1856, current church dedicated in 1894
St. Francis de Sales Church		129-16 Rockaway Beach Blvd, Belle Harbor	
St. Helen Church		157-10 83 St, Howard Beach	Constructed in 1962.
St. Joan of Arc Church		82-00 35th Ave, Jackson Heights	
St Francis of Assisi Church		21-17 45th St, Astoria,	Constructed in 1930.
St. John Vianney Church		140-10 34 Ave, Flushing	
St. Joseph Church		43-19 30th Ave, Astoria	Founded in 1879, current church dedicated in 1900s.
St. Leo Church		104-05 49th Ave, Corona	
St. Luke Church		16-34 Clintonville St, Whitestone	Founded in 1870
St. Mary's Church		10-08 49th Ave, Long Island City	Founded in 1868, current church dedicated 1894.
St. Mary Gate of Heaven Church		103-12 101st Ave, Ozone Park	Founded in 1904.
St. Mary Magdalene Church		218-12 136th Ave, Springfield Gardens	Constructed in 1909.
St. Mary Star of the Sea and St. Gertrude Church		1920 New Haven Ave, Far Rockaway	Founded in 1847.
St. Mary's of Winfield Church		70-31 48th Ave, Woodside	Constructed in 1874.
St. Margaret Church		66-05 79th Pl., Middle Village	Founded in 1860
St. Matthias Church		58-15 Catalpa Ave, Ridgewood	Italian Renaissance Revival, construction started in 1924.
St. Mel Church		26-15 154th St, Flushing	
St. Michael Church		138-25 Barclay Ave, Flushing	First parish in Queens, founded in 1833.
St. Nicholas Tolentine Church		150-75 Goethals Ave, Jamaica	Constructed in 1964.
St. Pancras Church		72-22 68 St, Glendale	Founded in 1898, current church dedicated in 1926
St. Patrick Church		39-38 29th St, Long Island City	Founded in 1868, current church dedicated in 1898
St. Paul Chong Ha-Sang Church		32-15 Parsons Blvd, Flushing	
St. Pius V Church		106-12 Liverpool St, Jamaica	
St. Pius X Church		148-10 249th St, Rosedale	Parish founded in 1960.
St. Raphael Church		35-20 Greenpoint Ave, Long Island City	
St. Rita Church		36-25 11th St, Long Island City	Constructed in 1900.
St. Rose of Lima Church		130 Beach 84th St, Rockaway Beach	Constructed in 1907.
SS. Joachim and Anne Parish		218-26 105th Ave, Queens Village	
St. Sebastian Church		39-66 58th St, Woodside	New church consecrated in 1954; Romanesque Revival
St. Theresa Church		50-20 45 St, Woodside	Constructed in 1952.
St. Thomas the Apostle Church		87-19 88 Ave, Woodhaven	Founded in 1922
Transfiguration ~ Saint Stanislaus Kostka Parish		St. Stanislaus Kostka Church, 57-15 61st St, Maspeth	Founded in 1872, current church dedicated in 1924, Combined with Transfiguration in 2006
		Transfiguration Church, 64-25 Perry Ave, Maspeth	Lithuanian national church. Parish founded in 1908, current church dedicated in 1962.Combined with St. Stanislaus in 2006/

== Former churches ==
Name	Image	Location	Description/Notes
Sacred Hearts of Jesus and Mary		Brooklyn	Gothic Revival church demolished due to construction of the Brooklyn–Queens Expressway; merged in 1941 to form Sacred Hearts of Jesus and Mary and St. Stephen.
St. Lucy-St. Patrick Church		285 Willoughby Ave	St. Patrick dedicated in 1856, combined with St. Lucy in 20th century. Building closed in 2008.
St. Michael & St. Edward Church		108 St. Edwards St, Fort Greene	St. Edward opened in 1908, combined with St. Michael in 1942. Building closed in 2008.
St. Monica		9420 160th St, Queens	Closed, now site of York College Child and Family Center
