= List of cathedrals in New York (state) =

This is a list of cathedrals in the state of New York, United States:

Municipality	Cathedral	Image	Location & references
Albany	Cathedral of the Immaculate Conception (Roman Catholic)		42°38′51″N 73°45′35″W
Albany	Cathedral of All Saints (Episcopal)		42°39′17″N 73°45′28″W
Buffalo	St. Joseph Cathedral (Roman Catholic)		42°52′58″N 78°52′41″W
Buffalo	St. Paul's Cathedral (Episcopal)		42°52′59″N 78°52′34″W
Elmont	St. Vincent de Paul Cathedral (Syro-Malankara Catholic Church)		40°42′36″N 73°41′48″W
Garden City	Cathedral of the Incarnation (Episcopal)		40°43′16″N 73°38′32″W
Hempstead	Cathedral of St. Paul (Greek Orthodox)		40°42′37″N 73°38′04″W
Jordanville	Holy Trinity Cathedral (Russian Orthodox Church Outside Russia)		42°55′38″N 74°56′04″W
Lancaster	Holy Mother of the Rosary Cathedral (Polish National Catholic Church) (not in full communion with Rome)		42°53′32″N 78°35′55″W
Malverne	Cathedral Church of the Intercessor (Charismatic Episcopal Church)		40°40′34″N 73°40′15″W
New Paltz	Cathedral of Christ the King (Charismatic Episcopal Church)		41°42′28″N 74°05′34″W
New York (Manhattan)	St. Patrick's Cathedral (Roman Catholic)		40°45′31″N 73°58′35″W
New York (Manhattan)	Basilica of St. Patrick's Old Cathedral (Roman Catholic)		40°43′25″N 73°59′44″W
New York (Manhattan)	Cathedral of St. John the Divine (Episcopal)		40°48′13″N 73°57′41″W
New York (Manhattan)	Cathedral of the Holy Trinity (Greek Orthodox)		40°46′11″N 73°57′22″W
New York (Manhattan)	Cathedral of the Holy Virgin Protection (Orthodox Church in America)		40°43′28″N 73°59′22″W
New York (Manhattan)	St. Ann's Cathedral (former cathedral) (Armenian Catholic)		40°43′56″N 73°59′21″W
New York (Manhattan)	St. Vartan Cathedral (Armenian Church in America) (Oriental Orthodox Communion)		40°44′42″N 73°58′31″W
New York (Manhattan)	Saint Illuminator's Cathedral (Armenian Apostolic Church) (Oriental Orthodox Communion)		40°44′28″N 73°58′48″W
New York (Manhattan)	Cathedral of the Theotokos of the Sign (Russian Orthodox Church Outside of Russia)		40°47′05″N 73°57′14″W
New York (Manhattan)	St. Nicholas Cathedral (Russian Orthodox Patriarchate of Moscow)		40°47′18″N 73°57′15″W
New York (Manhattan)	Cathedral of St. Sava (Serbian Orthodox) (destroyed by fire, 2016)		40°44′37″N 73°59′25″W
New York (Manhattan)	Saints Kiril & Metodij Cathedral (Bulgarian Orthodox)		40°45′56″N 73°59′39″W
New York (Manhattan)	Holy Cross Pro-Cathedral (African Orthodox) (not in communion with the Ecumenical Patriarch)		40°48′38″N 73°56′41″W
New York (Manhattan)	Cathedral Church of St. Thomas the Apostle (Liberal Catholic Church International) (not in communion with Rome)		40°49′15″N 73°56′20″W
New York (Brooklyn)	Cathedral Basilica of St. James (Roman Catholic)		40°41′49″N 73°59′12″W
New York (Brooklyn)	Co-Cathedral of St. Joseph (Roman Catholic)		40°40′50″N 73°57′59″W
New York (Brooklyn)	Sts. Constantine and Helen Cathedral (Greek Orthodox)		40°41′26″N 73°59′28″W
New York (Brooklyn)	Cathedral of the Transfiguration of Our Lord (Orthodox Church in America)		40°43′10″N 73°57′13″W
New York (Brooklyn)	St. John the Forerunner Orthodox Cathedral (Russian Orthodox Church Outside Russia)		40°35′10″N 73°56′55″W
New York (Brooklyn)	Our Lady of Lebanon Cathedral (Maronite Catholic)		40°41′39″N 73°59′39″W
New York (Brooklyn)	St. Nicholas Antiochian Orthodox Cathedral, New York (Antiochian Orthodox)		40°41′16″N 73°59′05″W
New York (Brooklyn)	Holy Trinity Cathedral (Ukrainian Orthodox Church of the USA)		40°42′38″N 73°57′40″W
New York (Brooklyn)	St. Ann's Armenian Catholic Cathedral (former cathedral) (Armenian Catholic)		40°43′01″N 73°57′27″W
New York (Brooklyn)	St. Cyril's of Turau Cathedral (Belarusian Orthodox) (not in communion with the Ecumenical Patriarch)		40°41′14″N 73°59′04″W
New York (Queens)	St. Demetrios Cathedral (Greek Orthodox)		40°45′56″N 73°55′22″W
New York (Queens)	Cathedral of Saint Markella (Genuine Orthodox Church of America) (not in communion with the Ecumenical Patriarch)		40°46′50″N 73°54′38″W
Niagara Falls	St. George's Cathedral Church (Independent Anglican Church - Canada Synod)		
Ogdensburg	St. Mary's Cathedral (Roman Catholic)		44°41′56″N 75°29′08″W
Poughkeepsie	Church of the Holy Comforter (Holy Orthodox Catholic and Apostolic Church of America)		
Rochester	Sacred Heart Cathedral (Roman Catholic)		43°11′35″N 77°37′58″W
Rockville Centre	St. Agnes Cathedral (Roman Catholic)		40°39′35″N 73°38′47″W
Syracuse	Cathedral of the Immaculate Conception (Roman Catholic)		43°02′49″N 76°08′59″W
Syracuse	St. Paul's Cathedral (Episcopal)		43°02′54″N 76°09′01″W

== See also ==
- List of cathedrals in the United States
