= Sacred Heart Convent =

Sacred Heart Convent may refer to:

- Sacred Heart Convent (Florissant, Missouri)
- Sacred Heart Convent of the Mary of Nazareth Parish (Brooklyn)
