= St. Raymond's Church (Bronx) =

Church in New York, United States

Coordinates: 40°50′30.16″N 73°51′13.12″W

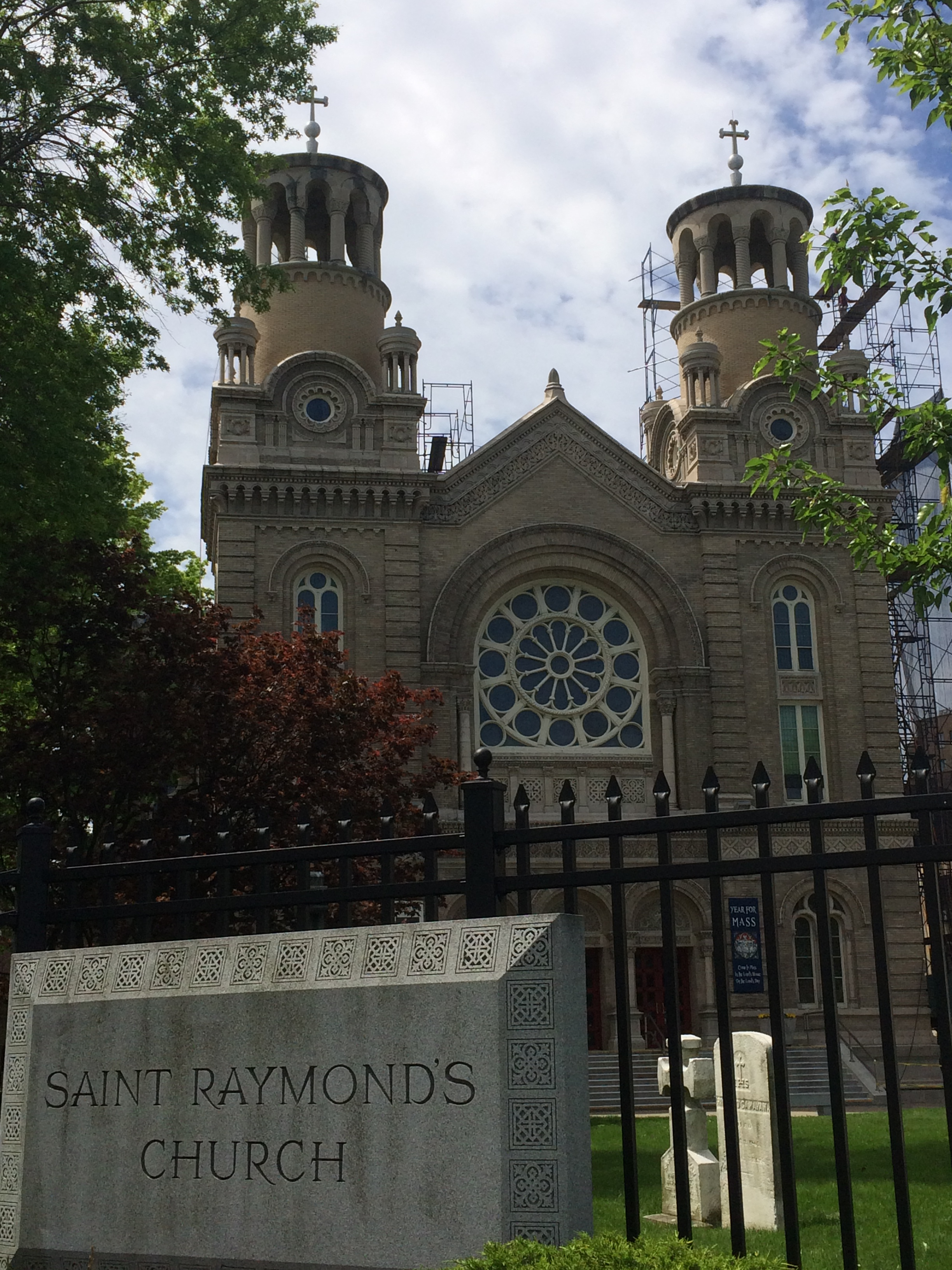
- St. Raymond's Church facing East Tremont Ave.
- Interactive map of the St. Raymond's Church area

General information
- Location: Parkchester, Bronx, New York City, New York, United States
- Construction started: 1908 (for school);
- Completed: 1845 (for first church); 1898 (for present church); 1909 (for school)
- Client: Roman Catholic Archdiocese of New York

Design and construction
- Architect: George H. Streeton of Brooklyn, New York

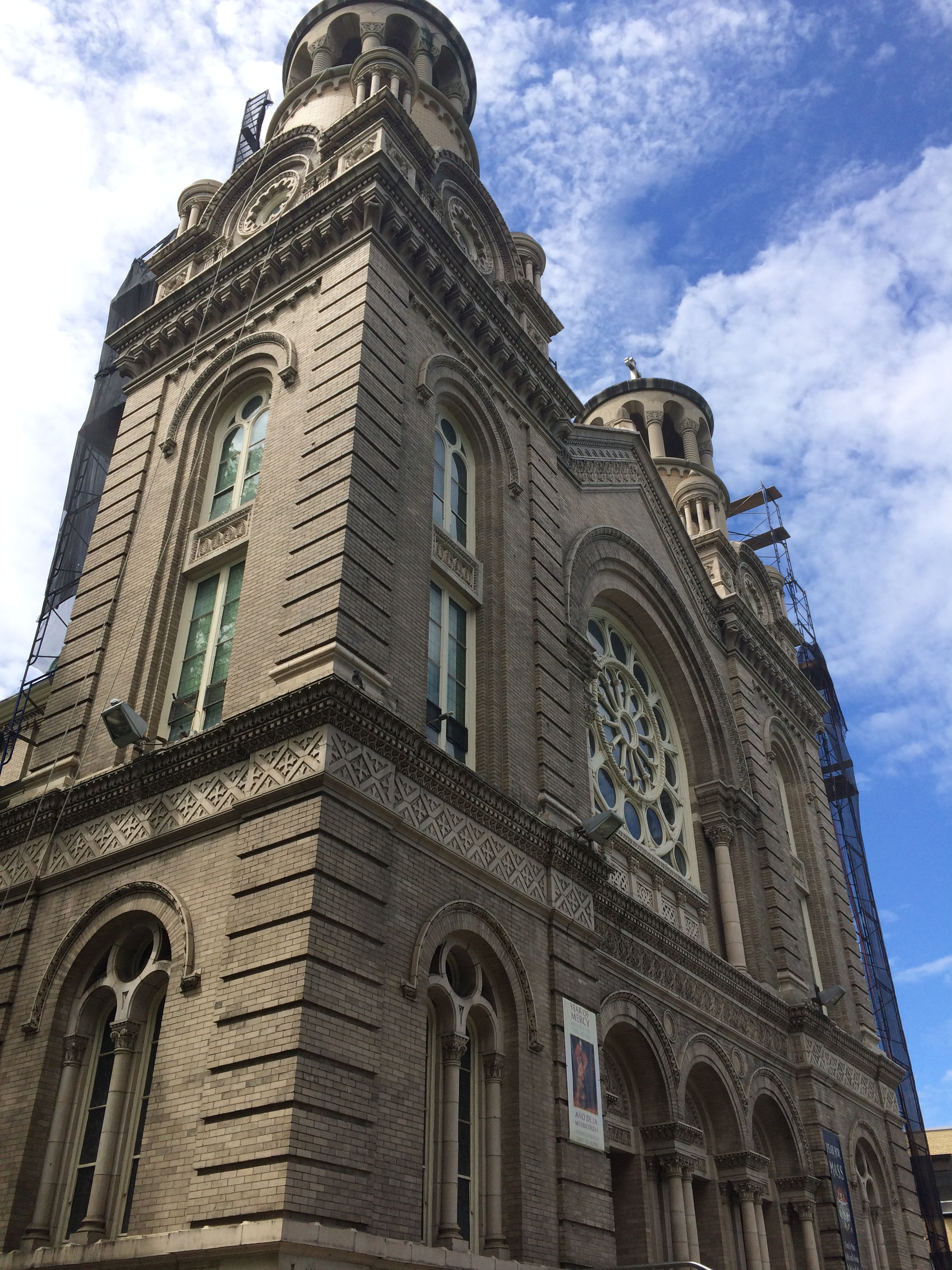

St. Raymond's Church is a parish church under the authority of the Roman Catholic Archdiocese of New York, located at Castle Hill Avenue at Tremont Avenue in Parkchester, Bronx, New York City. The parish was established in 1842. It was dedicated on the feast of St. Raymond Nonnatus, on August 31, 1845, thus getting its name. The church is a stained glass window of St. Raymond Nonnatus and the men who took him hostage.

== Parish ==
The parish of St. Raymond's predates the creation of the Bronx borough, when the area was still part of southern Westchester County, New York. Bishop John Dubois of New York had a deed executed on December 2, 1835, at a cost of $160 for the 125-by-26-foot (38.1 by 7.9 m) plot of land situated about two miles north of Fort Schuyler, New York. A church and/or school were intended to be constructed that year on the plot of land, however, nothing was erected.

In 1842, Bishop John Hughes purchased the acre that the current St. Raymond's Church is located on, and converted an old wooden barn into a temporary church. In 1847 an adjoining acre was purchased. The land purchased coincided with the 1840 founding of St. John's College in the village of Fordham, the future Fordham University. In 1842 Fr. Felix Vilanis, Superior at St. John's, was appointed to attend to the people of Westchester and the villages along the Sound. He built the first church and had it dedicated August 31, 1845. After the Mass, Bishop Hughes blessed the cemetery which had been laid out adjoining the church.

By 1850, St. Raymond's was responsible for had nine mission churches in the Bronx. Due to a shortage of priests and poor roads it was not possible to say Mass at each mission chapel every week, so the priests rode circuit visiting each in turn.

In 1865 the Catholic Protectory, an orphanage organized for the protection of destitute Catholic children purchased 114 acres of nearby farmland with several barns. A school and dormitories were built. Under the direction of the Brothers of Christian Schools and the Sisters of Charity, the children were given an education and taught a trade. The boys learned shoemaking, baking, carpentry, blacksmithing, wheelwrighting, farming, and gardening. The girls learned to embroider, cook and make gloves. The institution was an integral part of the parish until it was sold in 1938.

Among the notable pastors were the Rev. William O'Reilly, pastor in the late 1840s, who was the brother of the second Bishop of Hartford, and later rector of Our Lady of the Isle in Newport, Rhode Island and Vicar General of the Diocese of Hartford. The Rev. I. A. Kensella (pastor from 1857 to 1875) left around $18,000 in his will for the erection of a new church. The forward-thinking Rev. Michael B. McEvoy (pastor from 1875 to 1885), bought the Underhill Farm on Throgg's Neck and had it consecrated for burial purpose as St. Raymond's Cemetery, one of the borough's notable cemeteries.

== Buildings ==
The original Church became too small and many parishioners had to stand at Mass because it was over capacity. On August 4, 1897, ground was broken for the new Church, designed in the Byzantine Revival-style. The architect of St. Raymond Church was George H. Streeton of Brooklyn who also designed the Cathedral Basilica of St. James in Brooklyn, as well as St. Raphael's Church in Manhattan (1900–1902). The building was dedicated October 23, 1898. In 1932, the old main altar of wood was replaced with one of marble.

In 1908, Cardinal Logue laid the cornerstone of the new school, which opened September 1909. The current elementary school was opened in 1951. The parish also administers St. Raymond Academy, a high school for girls founded in 1960 and St. Raymond High School for Boys established in 1962.

== Pastors ==
1. Rev. Felix Vilanis (1842)
2. Rev. Higgins (returned to Ireland when his health failed)
3. Rev, William O'Reilly, brother of the second Bishop of Hartford, and afterward rector of Our Lady of the Isle (Newport, Rhode Island) and Vicar General of the Diocese of Hartford.
4. Rev. Eugene McGuire (left 1853)
5. Rev. Richard Kien (1853 until his death on January 9, 1854)
6. Rev. Michael O'Reilly (February 4, 1854 – 1857)
7. Rev. I. A. Kensella (July 14, 1857 - January 6, 1875, who in his will left $1000 for every year he was pastor of this church for the erection of a new church)
8. Rev. Michael B. McEvoy (appointed February 1875 to 1885, who bought the Underhill Farm on Throggs Neck, now known as St. Raymond's Cemetery and had it consecrated for burial purposes)
9. Rev. Charles F. O'Keeffe (1885-1888)
10. Msgr. Edward McKenna, P.R. (b. July 18, 1843 in the parish of Truagh, County Monaghan, Ireland, pastor of St. Raymond's from 1888)
