= Holy Cross Roman Catholic Church =

Holy Cross Roman Catholic Church may refer to:

- Holy Cross Roman Catholic Church (Baltimore, Maryland)
- Holy Cross Roman Catholic Church (Maspeth, New York)
