= Mary of Nazareth Parish (Brooklyn) =

Catholic parish in New York, United States

Coordinates: 40.696666°N 73.972160°W

Mary of Nazareth Parish is a Catholic parish in the Diocese of Brooklyn. It was formed in 2008 with the merger of Sacred Heart Parish and the Parish of St. Michael and St. Edward.

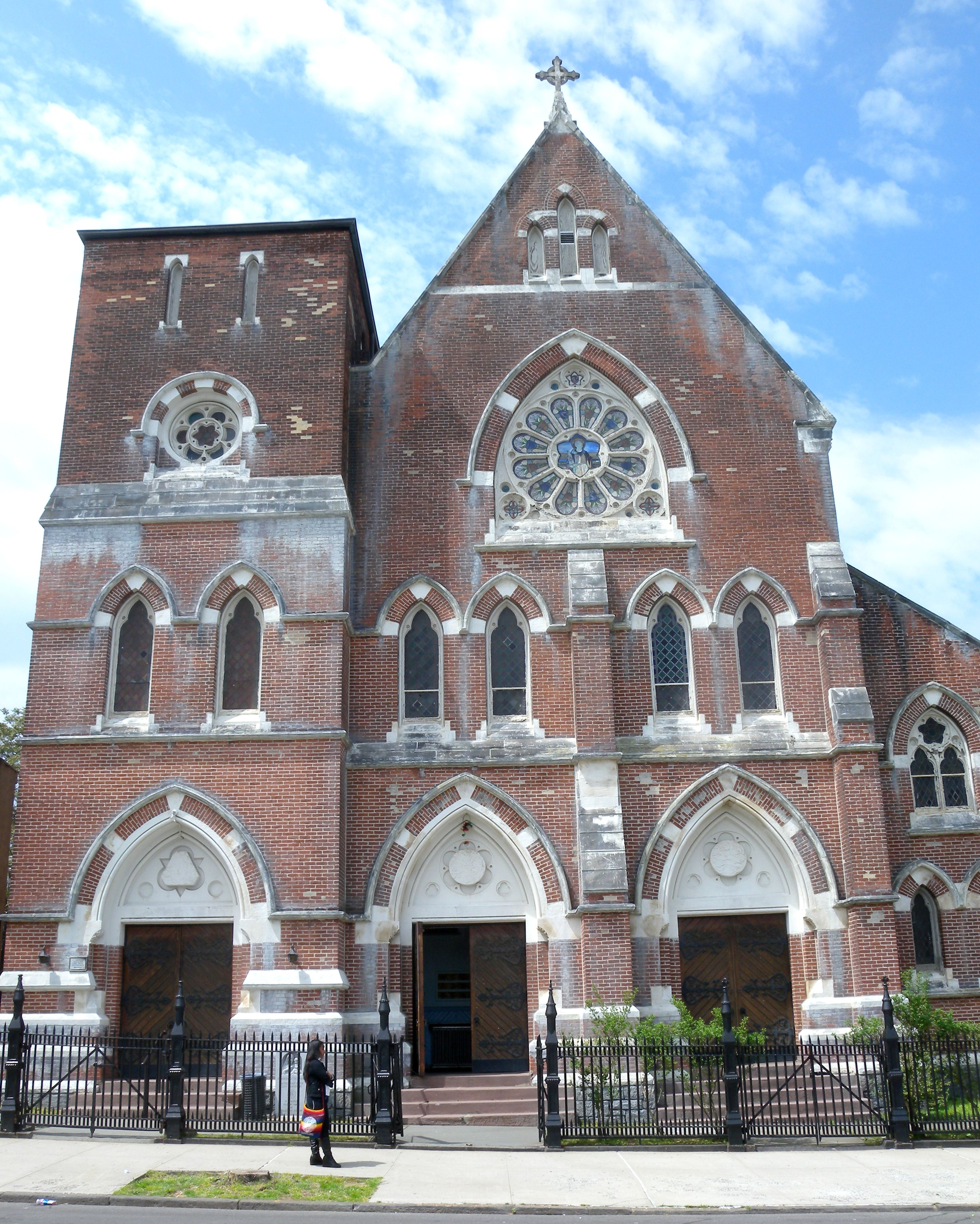
Sacred Heart Parish 41 Adelphia St.

== Mary of Nazareth Parish ==
Mary of Nazareth now takes in an area that was once served by five separate parishes, some of them national (serving a specific ethnic group), some territorial. Until 2024 it was one parish with two churches, Sacred Heart and St. Patrick. In January 2024, the St. Lucy-St. Patrick Roman Catholic Church was torn down to make way for a new housing development.

== History ==
=== Sacred Heart ===
The Church of the Sacred Heart at 41 Adelphi Street in Brooklyn, New York, was founded in 1871. The church began in an old primary school building on Vanderbilt Avenue, which Rev. Thomas F. McGivern remodeled. He said the first Mass on December 3, 1871. He then purchased property between Adelphi and Clermont Streets. Bishop of Brooklyn, John Loughlin laid the cornerstone on May 10, 1872, and the church was dedicated in June 1877. It was designed by Thomas Houghton, master draftsman for Patrick Keely. The organ, installed in 1877, is one of the last, large and intact Jardines extant in New York City; it was repaired and restored in 2001. One of the first official acts of newly appointed Bishop Charles Edward McDonnell was the conferring of Confirmation on 600 individuals on May 18, 1892. Sacred Heart Academy was founded by pastor John F. Nash and opened on September 7, 1888. The parish, which in 1871 had 600 parishioners, numbered 6,000 by 1914.

In 2008, Sacred Heart merged with the parishes of St. Lucy–St. Patrick and St. Michael–St. Edward to form the new parish of Mary of Nazareth.

==== St. Lucy – St. Patrick ====
In 1974 St. Lucy's parish was merged into St. Patrick to create the new parish of St. Lucy–St. Patrick. The parish merged with Sacred Heart in 2008.

===== St. Patrick Church =====
St. Patrick was established in 1843. a small, frame, Methodist meeting house with two lots was purchased on Kent Avenue in the Wallabout section and served for a church at first. The cornerstone of the red brick church designed by Patrick Keely was laid on November 5, 1854. The building reflects Keely's early development in the gothic style. Originally called St. Mary's, its name was changed to St. Patrick in 1856. In 2024, the church was demolished.

===== Church of St. Lucy =====
The Church of St. Lucy on Kent Ave. was founded by Rev. Francesco Castellano of Our Lady of Mt. Carmel. In 1903 he acquired a building which had previously served as a Protestant church and had it remodeled for Catholic worship. An Italian parish, future Bishop of Brooklyn Francis Mugavero was christened at St. Lucy's. Like many other churches, the basement was finished first and services were conducted there until the upper church was completed. St. Lucy's was dedicated by Bishop Thomas Edmund Molloy on December 11, 1921. St. Lucy's merged with St. Patrick in 1974.

=== St. Michael and St. Edward ===
The parishes of St. Michael and St. Edward merged in 1942 to form the Parish of St. Michael and St. Edward located at 108 St. Edwards Street.

==== St. Michael the Archangel ====
St. Michael the Archangel was founded in 1891 as an Italian national parish. The first pastor was Rev. Pasquale de Nisco. In 1905 Rev. Joachim Garafalo opened Immaculate Conception kindergarten in a house on Front St. The original St. Michael's was built in 1848 as a Baptist Church. It was converted into a Catholic church in 1880 by Polish residents of the area. As the neighborhood changed, it then served a predominantly Italian-speaking congregation. Originally located at 24 Lawrence St, downtown Brooklyn, it is rumored to be the baptismal parish of Al Capone. In 1913 after a fire burned the parish down, Rev. Joseph R. Agrella began construction of a new church on the corner of Prince and Concord. In 1942, after facing demolition for the construction of the BQE, St. Michael's was merged with St. Edward.

==== St. Edward the Confessor ====
St. Edward the Confessor was established on the corner of Canton and Division Streets in 1891, due to overcrowding at St. James, Our Lady of Mercy, and Sacred Heart. Canton was renamed St. Edwards Street, and Division St. Leo Place, after Pope Leo XIII. Work on the Romanesque Revival church, designed by John J. Deery, progressed slowly and was completed in 1906. It was constructed of gray brick trimmed with terra cotta. During construction, Mass was held in the completed, roofed basement. The church closed in 2010 due to deteriorating conditions, with it collapsing from the inside, and was eventually demolished in 2023.
