= St. Stanislaus Kostka Roman Catholic Church (Queens) =

Catholic church in Queens, New York City, USA

Coordinates: 40.722769°N 73.904260°W

- Interactive map of the St. Stanislaus Kostka Roman Catholic Church area

General information
- Location: Maspeth, Queens, New York, United States of America

St. Stanislaus Kostka Catholic Church is a Catholic church in Maspeth, Queens, New York City, whose parish was organized in 1872. Historically, it is one of only three churches in the area to have organized schools for its parishioners, known as the St. Stanislaus Kostka School. It belongs to the Parish of Saint Stanislaus Kostka - Transfiguration, together with Transfiguration Catholic Church, .

== History ==
One of the goals of building the church in 1872 was to provide a house of prayer and worship to local farmers living far away from St. Mary's Church that was located in the neighboring Winfield section of Woodside, Queens. Its original building was formerly located at 64-25 Perry Avenue in Maspeth, Queens. Its current pastor is Rev. Msgr. Joseph P. Calise.

== See also ==
- Holy Cross Roman Catholic Church (Queens)
- St. Adalbert Roman Catholic Church

== Bibliography ==
- Maspeth...Our Town by Barbara Stankowski
- Our Community, Its History and People by Walter J. Hutter, Rev. John D. O’Halloran, Maureen Walthers and Philip P. Agusta (Greater Ridgewood Historical Society)
