= George H. Streeton =

American architect

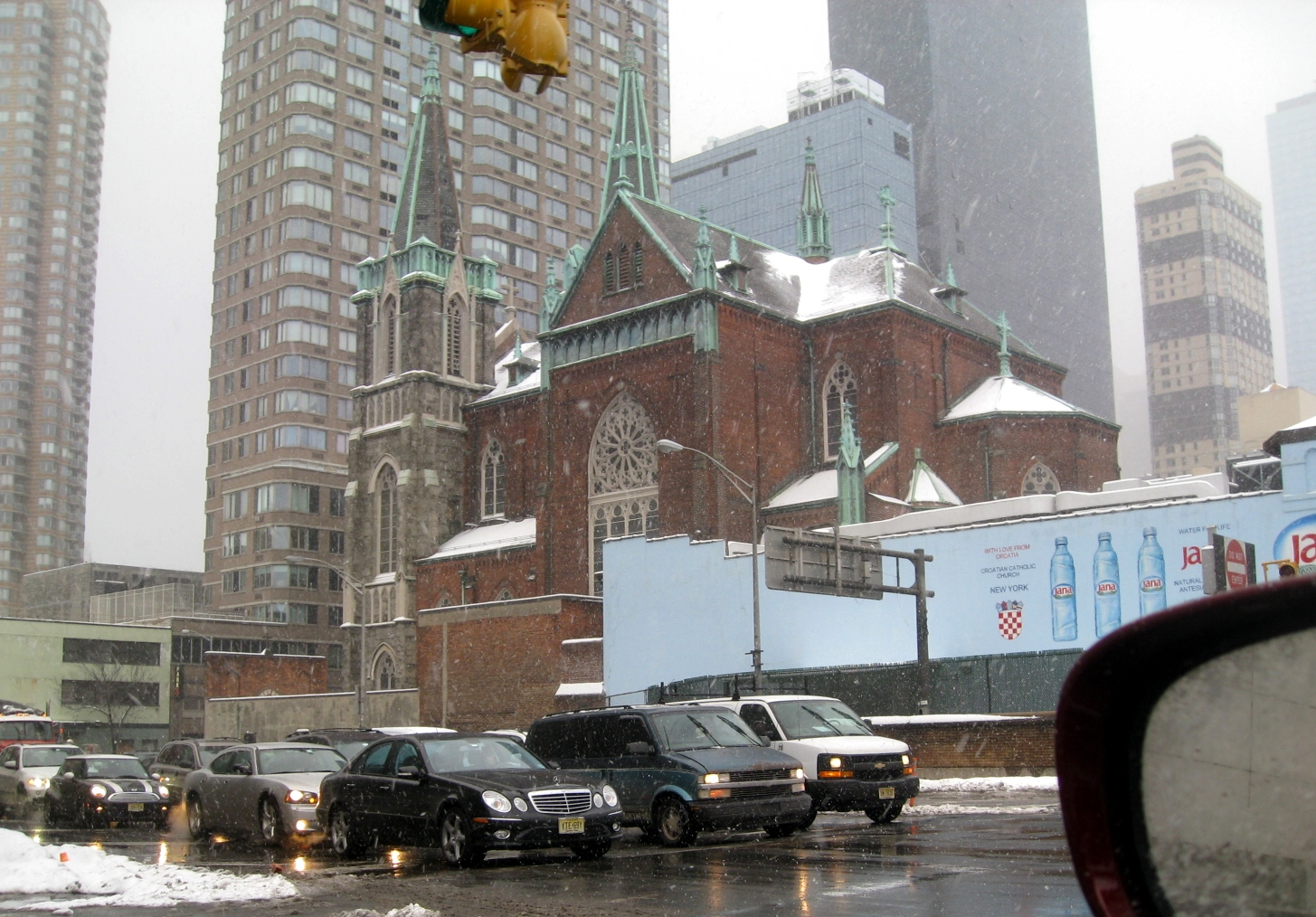
- The Church of Saints Cyril & Methodius and St. Raphael, the former Church of St. Raphael, in the midst of the incoming traffic to the Lincoln Tunnel, Manhattan
- Born: September 28, 1864; Brooklyn, New York
- Known for: Architecture

George H. Streeton, AIA (born 1864) was an American architect who worked in New York during the first half of the twentieth century, primarily for Roman Catholic clients.

== Early life and education ==
Streeton was born September 28, 1864, in Brooklyn, New York. He studied at the Ferrari Modeling School at Cooper Union and Cornell University. He worked for a time for the firm of Schickel and Ditmars before going into business under his own name.

== Architectural practice ==
He designed numerous religious buildings for Roman Catholic congregations in the Archdiocese of New York and the Diocese of Brooklyn.

== Works ==
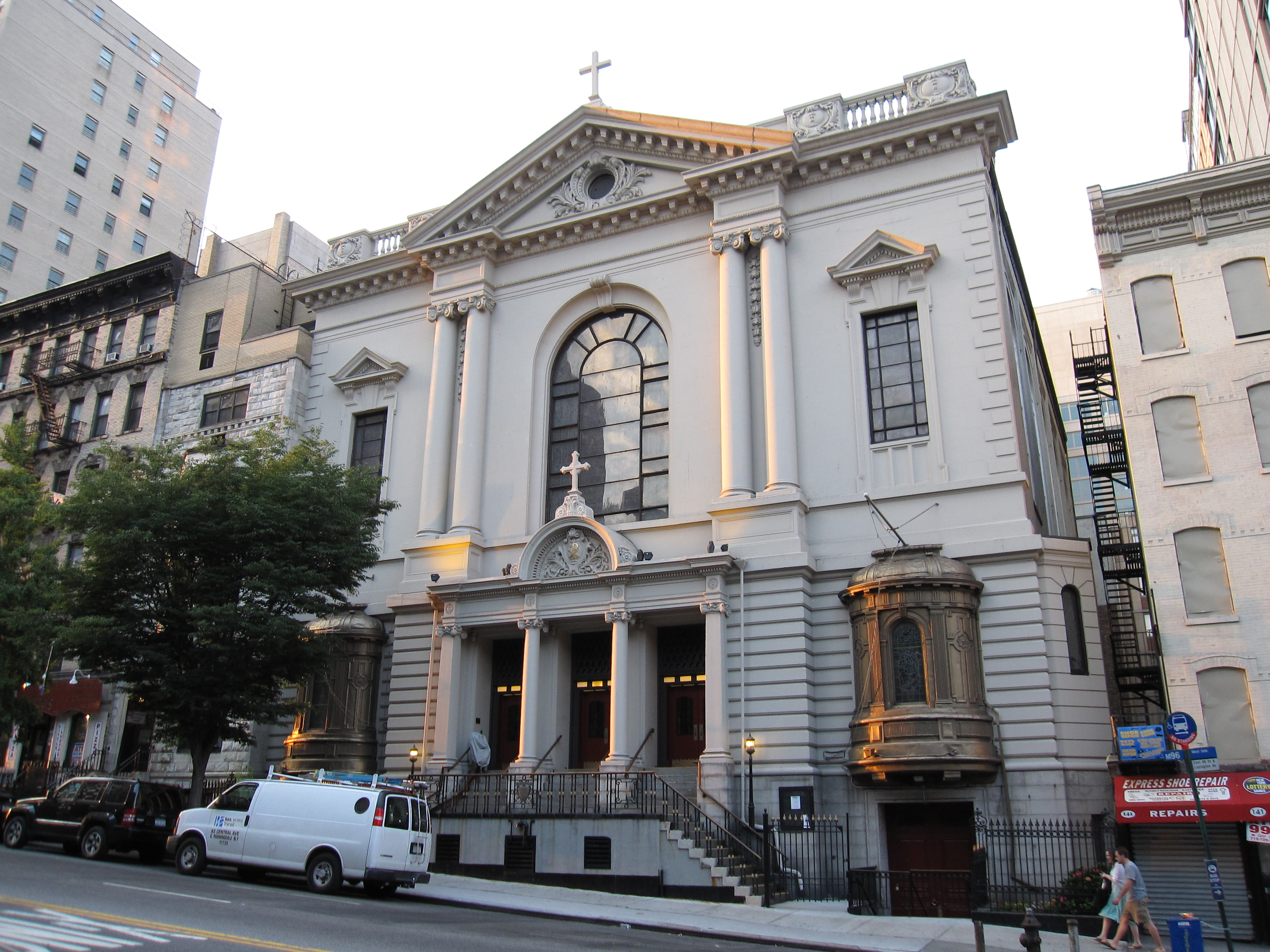
St Francis de Sales, Manhattan

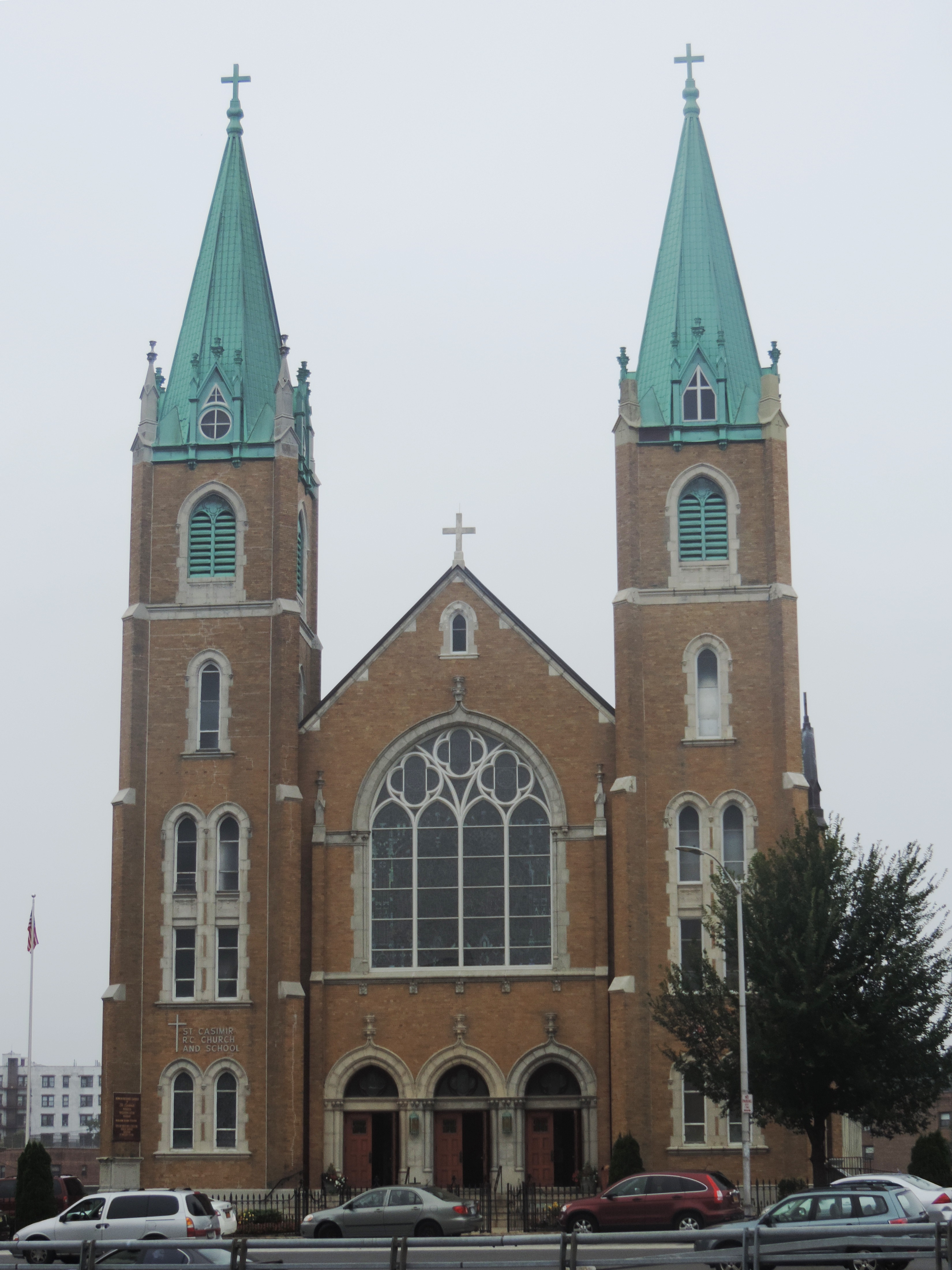
St Casimir, Yonkers

- Cathedral of St. James, Brooklyn
- St. Ambrose Church, 222 Tompkins and Dekalb Avenues, Brooklyn
- St. Cyril & St. Methodius and St. Raphael Church, Manhattan, New York
- 1910: The Church of the Guardian Angel Manhattan, New York (original church, replaced in 1930 by John Van Pelt)
- St. Charles Borromeo Church, Manhattan, New York
- St. Francis De Sales Church, Manhattan, New York (enlargement of church by O'Connor & Metcalf, 6 years earlier)
- St. Casimir Church, Yonkers, New York
- St. Patrick's Academy, Brooklyn, New York Alterations to a catholic school on Kent Street, originally built in 1870. Work done in 1901.
- St. Raymond Church Westchester, New York
- St. Peter's Church Rectory, Staten Island, New York (church by George Edward Harding & Gooch)

== Works attributed to George H. Streeton ==
- St. Philip Neri Church, Bronx, New York
