= Charles Edward McDonnell =

American prelate

His Excellency, The Right Reverend Charles Edward McDonnell
- Bishop of Brooklyn
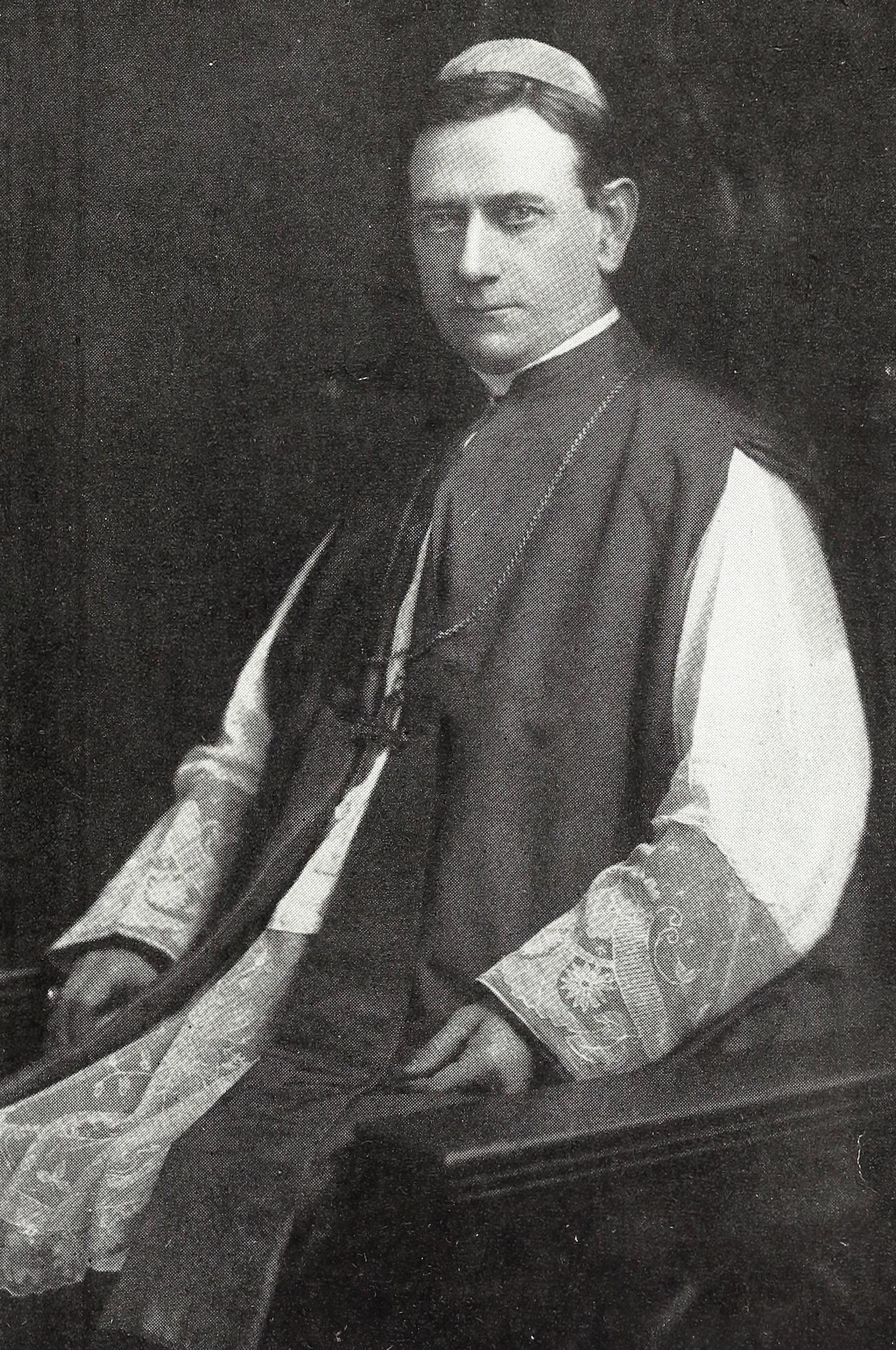
- Church: Roman Catholic Church
- Diocese: Roman Catholic Diocese of Brooklyn
- Appointed: March 11, 1892
- Predecessor: John Loughlin
- Successor: Thomas Edmund Molloy

Orders
- Ordination: May 19, 1878 by Silas Chatard
- Consecration: March 25, 1892 by Michael Augustine Corrigan

Personal details
- Born: February 1, 1854 New York City, US
- Died: August 8, 1921 (aged 67) Brentwood, New York, US
- Buried: St. James Pro-Cathedral
- Education: Pontifical North American College
- Motto: Justitia et pax (Justice and peace)

Charles Edward McDonnell (February 1, 1854 – August 8, 1921) was an American prelate of the Roman Catholic Church. He served as bishop of Brooklyn in New York City from 1892 until his death in 1921.

== Biography ==
=== Early life ===
Charles McDonnell was born on February 1, 1854, in Manhattan to Charles and Eleanor (née Preston) McDonnell. His father was a printer. After attending De La Salle Institute, he entered St. Francis Xavier College in 1868, both in New York City. He was sent to Rome by Cardinal John McCloskey in 1872 to further his studies at the Pontifical North American College.

=== Priesthood ===
While in Rome, McDonnell was ordained to the priesthood for the Archdiocese of New York by Bishop Francis Silas Chatard on May 19, 1878. He earned his Doctor of Divinity degree shortly afterwards.

Following his return to New York in the fall of 1878, the archdiocese assigned McDonnell as a curate at St. Mary's Parish in Manhattan. He was transferred in 1879 to St. Stephen's Parish in Manhattan and shortly afterwards to the new St. Patrick's Cathedral Parish in Manhattan, where he served as master of ceremonies. McCloskey named McDonnell as his private secretary in 1884. When Michael Corrigan became archbishop, he kept McDonnell as his private secretary and named him chancellor of the archdiocese in 1889. In 1890, McDonnell was elevated to the rank of private chamberlain by Pope Leo XIII.

=== Bishop of Brooklyn ===
On March 11, 1892, McDonnell was appointed the second bishop of Brooklyn by Leo XIII. He received his episcopal consecration on April 25, 1892, from Archbishop Michael Corrigan at St. Patrick's Cathedral. He was installed at St. James's Pro-Cathedral in Brooklyn on May 2, 1892. His first official act was the dedication of the new St. Augustine Church on May 15, 1892. This was followed by conferring confirmation to 600 individuals on May 18th at Church of the Sacred Heart in Brooklyn.

During McDonnell's 29-year-long tenure as bishop, the number of Catholics in the diocese increased from 250,000 in 1891 to 900,000 in 1921. He erected 54 parishes and schools for new immigrant groups settling in the diocese, many from Italy and Eastern Europe, as well as for Hispanics and African Americans. McDonnell adopted the policy of securing members of some order for each of the races and languages in his jurisdiction. He invited several religious institutes into the diocese, including the Redemptorists, Benedictines, Franciscans (including the Minor Conventuals and Capuchins), the Jesuits, the Sisters of the Holy Family of Nazareth, the Missionary Sisters of the Sacred Heart, the Daughters of Wisdom, and the Sisters of the Holy Infant Jesus.

McDonnell established the forerunner of the Catholic Schools Office in 1894 and the diocesan chapter of Catholic Charities in 1899. The Vatican named him an assistant at the pontifical throne in 1903. He founded the diocesan newspaper, The Tablet, in 1908. McDonnell added two hospitals and expanded the existing ones. He opened the Ozanam Home for Friendless Women, the new St. Vincent's Home for Friendless Boys in Brooklyn, two seaside recreation places for children and a trade school farm for orphans. He was described by the Brooklyn Eagle as "learned, judicious, amiable, firm and persuasive."

=== Death and legacy ===
McDonnell died on August 8, 1921, from kidney disease in Brentwood, New York, aged 67. His wake was held in St. James's Pro-Cathedral and he was buried in the downstairs crypt.

Catholic Church titles
Preceded by John Loughlin	Bishop of Brooklyn; 1892–1921	Succeeded by Thomas Edmund Molloy
