= Cathedral Basilica of St. James (Brooklyn) =

Cathedral Basilica of Saint James the Apostle
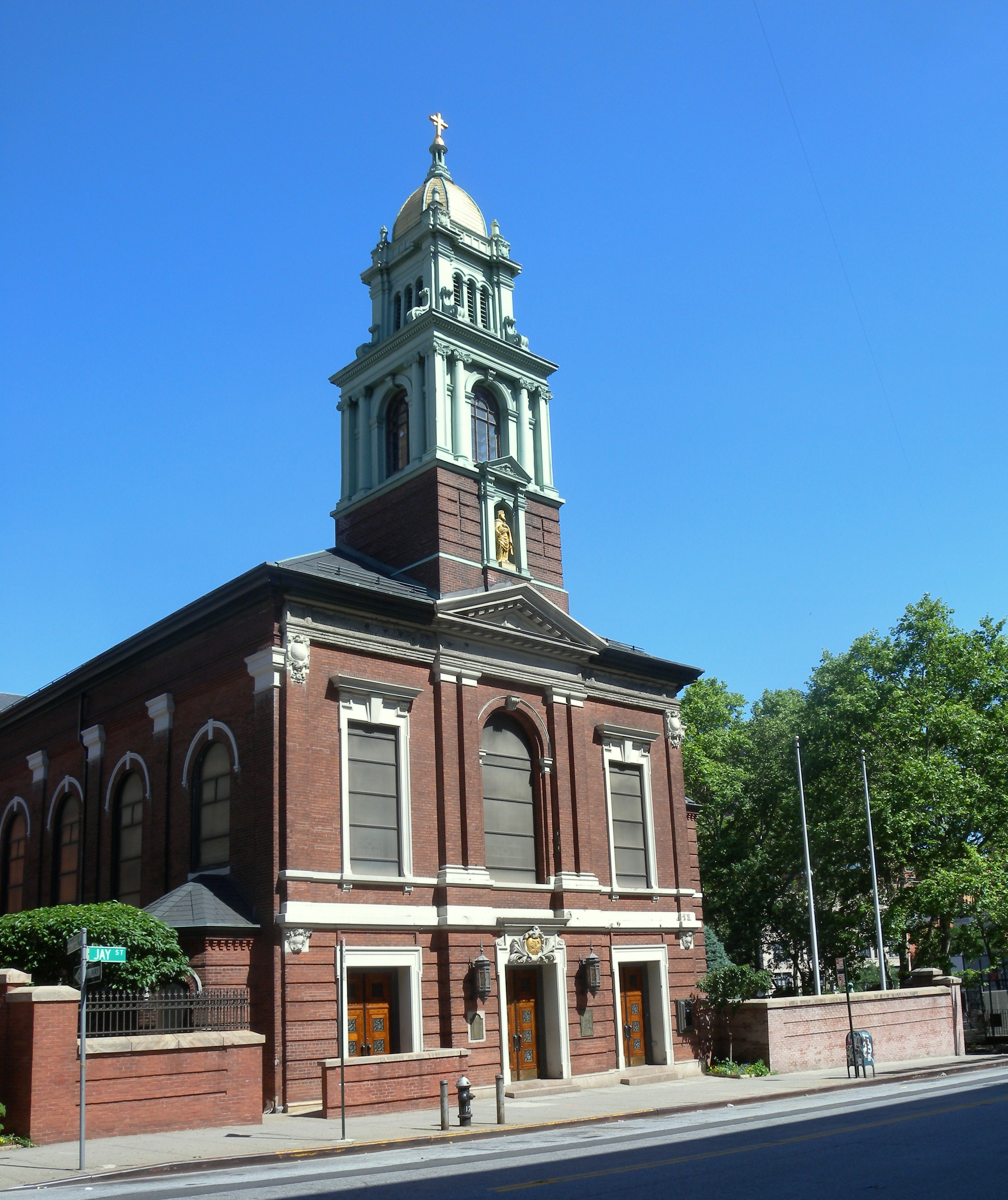

- Location within New York City
- 40°41′49.4″N 73°59′12″W
- Location: Jay Street & Cathedral Place; Brooklyn, New York
- Country: United States
- Denomination: Roman Catholic
- Website: brooklyncathedral.org

History
- Status: Cathedral (1853-1896; 1972-present); Pro-cathedral (1896-1972)
- Founded: 1822
- Dedication: James, son of Zebedee

Architecture
- Style: Georgian Revival
- Completed: 1903

Specifications
- Materials: Brick

Administration
- Diocese: Diocese of Brooklyn

Clergy
- Bishop: Most Rev. Robert J. Brennan
- Rector: Very Rev. Joseph R. Gibino, STM

The Cathedral Basilica of Saint James is the cathedral church of the Diocese of Brooklyn. It is located at the corner of Jay Street and Cathedral Place in Downtown Brooklyn, New York City. It was built in 1903 and designed by George H. Streeton in the Neo-Georgian style.

Pope John Paul II issued the Pontifical decree Prima inter Civitatis which raised the shrine to the status of Minor Basilica on 6 May 1982.

== History ==
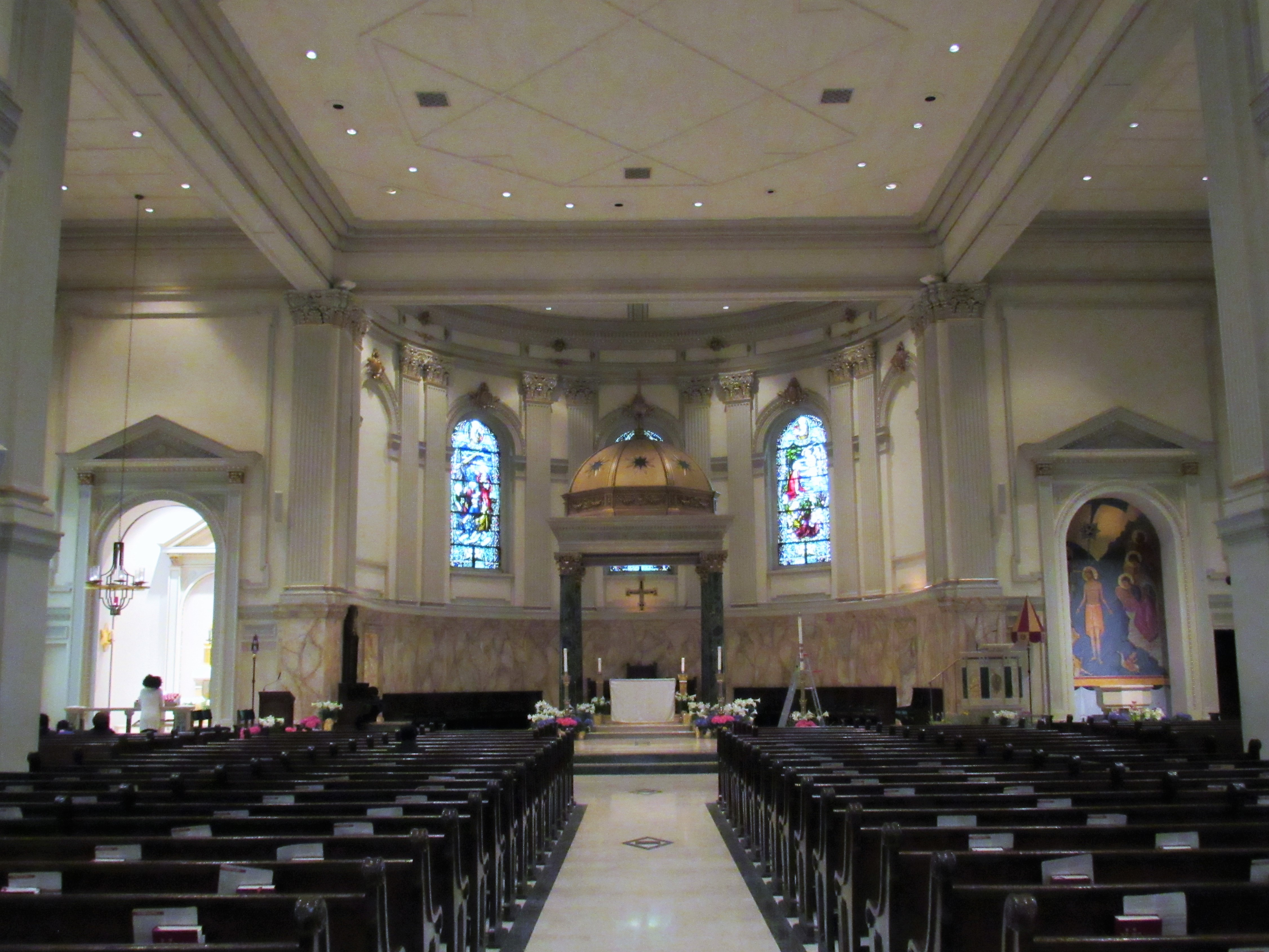
Interior of the cathedral basilica

The first church was built in 1822-1823 and dedicated to the patronage of St. James by Bishop John Connolly on August 28, 1823. It became the cathedral of Brooklyn when the diocese was established in 1853.

Brooklyn's first bishop, John Loughlin planned a new cathedral dedicated to the patroness of the diocese, the Immaculate Conception and its construction started in 1868 in Fort Greene, at Green Street and Clermont Avenue. The cornerstone for the new cathedral was laid, and the walls built to a height of 10 to 20 feet before construction was stopped due to inadequate funds; of the planned complex, only a chapel (no longer extant) and the Bishop's residence (now LaSalle Hall of Bishop Loughlin Memorial High School) were completed. In 1896, Louglin's successor Bishop McDonnell designated a St. James Cathedral a pro-cathedral, anticipating the completion of Immaculate Conception. Although the current church on the original site was built in 1903, it did not become a cathedral again until 1972. The newly elected Pope John Paul II visited in 1979, and formally designated it as a basilica in 1982.

While officially the cathedral for the diocese, many major ceremonies are held at larger churches because of St. James' small size. Accordingly, St. Joseph's Church in Prospect Heights was named co-cathedral for the diocese in 2013.

The Rector of St. James' Cathedral Basilica is Father Bryan Patterson.

== See also ==
- List of cathedrals in New York
