= Co-Cathedral of St. Joseph (Brooklyn) =

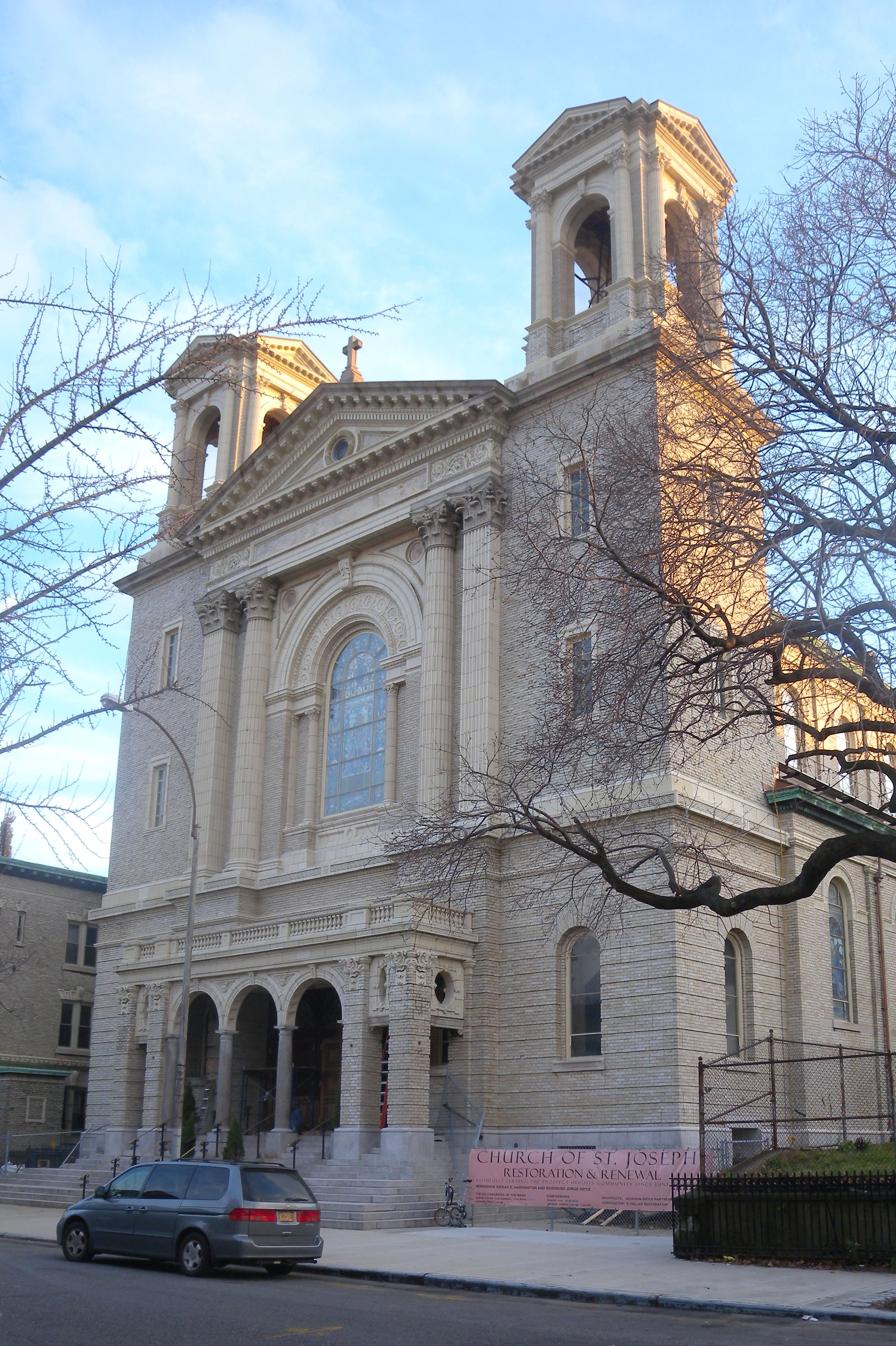

- Location within New York City
- 40°40′49.6″N 73°57′59.0″W
- Location: 856 Pacific Street; Brooklyn, New York
- Country: United States
- Denomination: Roman Catholic
- Website: Co-Cathedral Website

History
- Status: Cathedral
- Founded: 1850
- Dedication: Saint Joseph

Architecture
- Style: Spanish Colonial
- Completed: 1912

Specifications
- Capacity: 1,500
- Length: 150 feet (46 m)
- Width: 50 feet (15 m)
- Materials: Brick

Administration
- Diocese: Brooklyn

Clergy
- Bishop: Most Rev. Robert J. Brennan
- Rector: Very Rev. Patrick J. Keating

The Co-Cathedral of St. Joseph of the Roman Catholic Diocese of Brooklyn, located at 856 Pacific Street between Vanderbilt and Underhill Avenues in the Prospect Heights neighborhood of Brooklyn in New York City, was built in 1912 in the Spanish Colonial style, replacing a previous church built in 1861. The parish was founded in 1850 to serve the large immigrant population that was moving into the city of Brooklyn at the time.

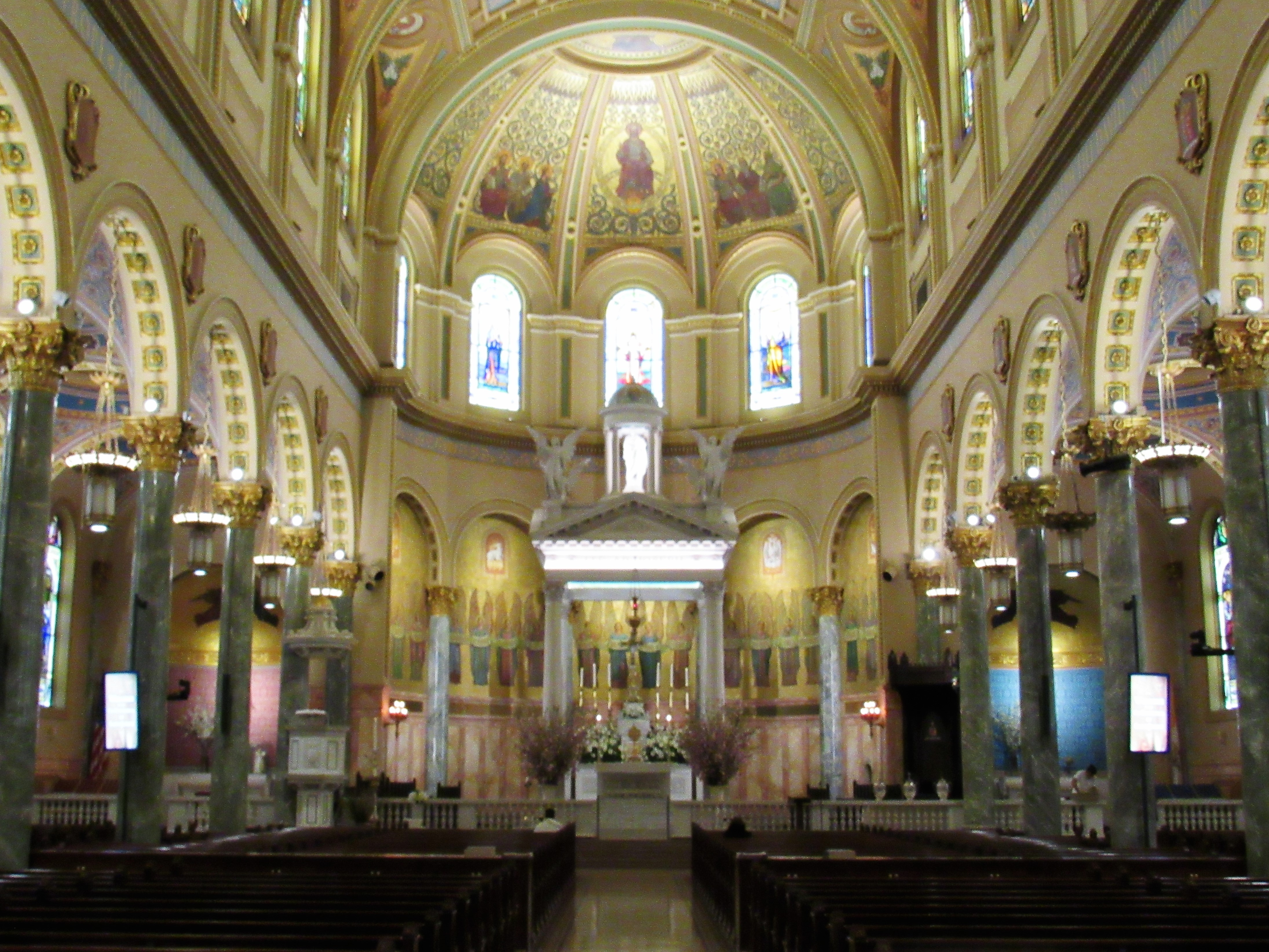
Interior of the co-cathedral

On February 14, 2013, Pope Benedict XVI approved the petition of Bishop Nicholas Anthony DiMarzio to have the church designated as the diocesan co-cathedral because the Cathedral Basilica of St. James is too small to hold diocesan liturgies, and because of its prime location near the newly opened Barclays Center and a construction boom that was to include 16,000 new apartments in the area. The church can hold 1,500 worshippers, and as of 2014 averaged 700 at Sunday mass, up from only a few dozen 10 years earlier. The building underwent an $18.5 million renovation.

The church's campus also includes a Gothic revival rectory next door at 834 Pacific Street, built around 1860, and a school at 683 Dean Street, built around 1920, which is now used as a senior center.

== See also ==
- List of cathedrals in New York
- List of cathedrals in the United States
- List of Catholic cathedrals in the United States
