= Saints Kyril & Metodi Bulgarian Eastern Orthodox Diocesan Cathedral =

Church in Manhattan, New York

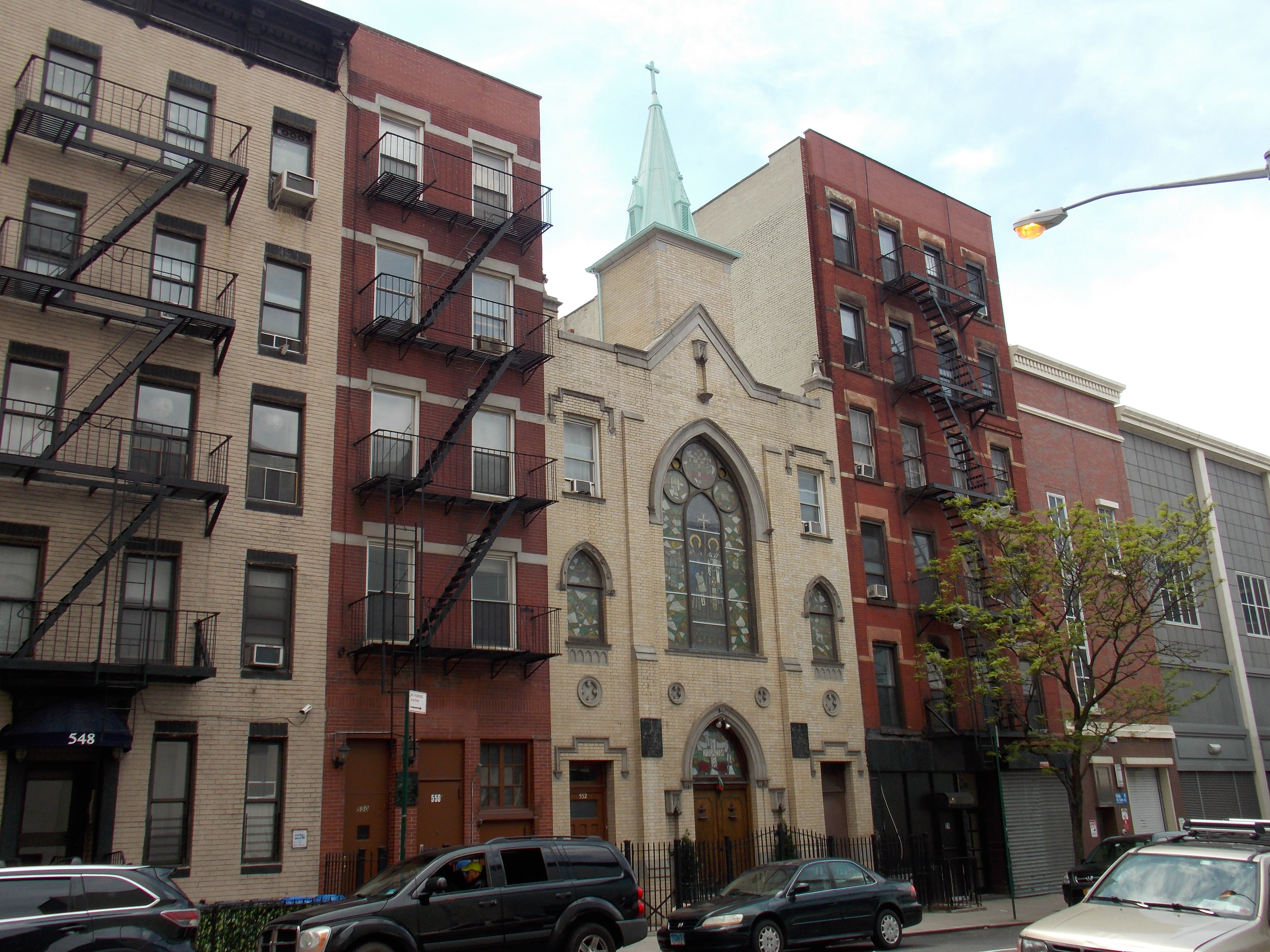
- Saints Kyril & Metodi Bulgarian Eastern Orthodox Diocesan Cathedral
- 40°45′56″N 73°59′39″W
- Location: 552 West 50th Street; New York, New York
- Country: United States
- Denomination: Bulgarian Orthodox Church

History
- Consecrated: May 13, 1984

Administration
- Diocese: Bulgarian Eastern Orthodox Diocese of the USA, Canada and Australia

Saints Kyril & Metodi Bulgarian Eastern Orthodox Diocesan Cathedral (sometimes SS. Kiril and Methodi) is the cathedral church and headquarters of the Bulgarian Orthodox Church Diocese of the United States, Canada, and Australia. The church is located at 552 West 50th Street, between Tenth and Eleventh Avenues, Hell's Kitchen / Clinton, Manhattan, New York City.

The building is 100 feet long, 28 feet wide, and 25 feet high, with a yellow brick façade. In 1890 its site was occupied by a silk-ribbon factory. By 1899, the church was up, with an organ installed.

In 1909 a Polish Catholic parish was formed, called St. Clemens Mary. (Clement Mary Hofbauer had been canonized on May 20, 1909.) It worshipped briefly in a candy store on 10th Avenue near 51st Street before renting the 50th Street church, which had been occupied by a Lutheran congregation. Meanwhile, its own new building was built at 410 West 40th Street, and completed in 1913. (Today it is the Metro Baptist Church.)

On October 16, 1913, a Catholic parish was founded in Manhattan by Croatian Franciscan friars to serve Croatian immigrants. The Franciscans rented the 50th Street church.

During a five-week renovation, German Franciscans from 31st St., a Slovak parish from Brooklyn, and a German church on 49th Street donated an altar, two statues, a chalice, books, garments for mass, and money. By early 1914, $21,000 was collected to purchase the church building, dedicating it to Saints Cyril and Methodius, ninth century Greek brothers recognized as saints by the Catholic Church in 1881. At that time the congregation numbered about 4,000.

After 60 years, the Croatian congregation moved into the grander St. Raphael's Church at 502 West 41st Street in 1974, forming the merged parishes of Sts. Cyril & Methodius and St. Raphael, after which the 50th Street building stood empty for several years. In 1979 it was purchased by the Bulgarian Eastern Orthodox Church, which retained the dedication to the Slavic patron saint, changing only the spelling. The cathedral had been at 312 West 101st Street for forty years. In 1982, a $500,000 interior renovation was undertaken, and the newly restored church was consecrated May 13, 1984.
