= Church of Sts. Cyril & Methodius and St. Raphael =

Coordinates: 40°45′32″N 73°59′48.5″W

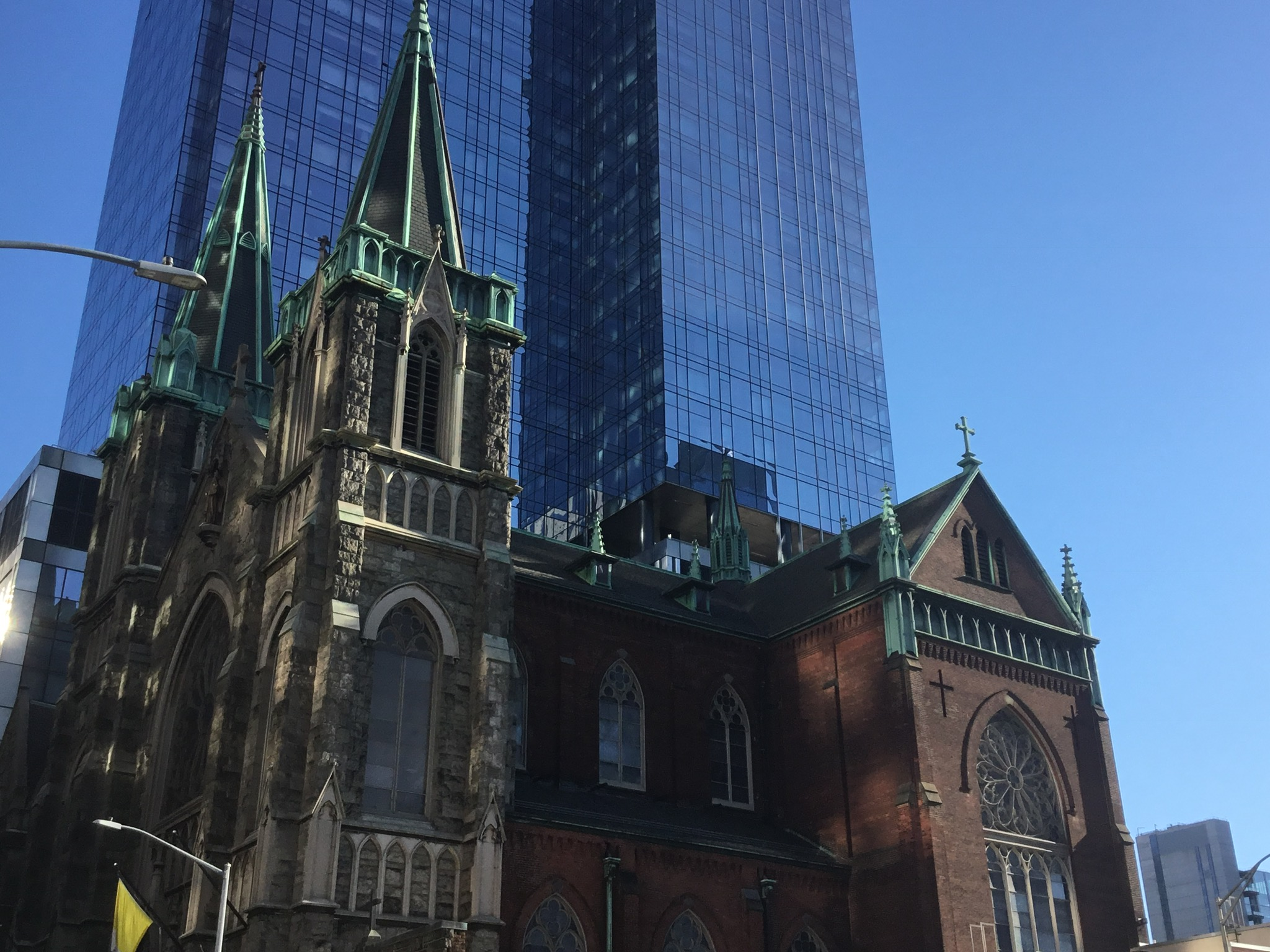
- West side of the church, 2022
- Church of Sts. Cyril & Methodius and St. Raphael
- Location: Hell's Kitchen; Manhattan, New York City
- Country: United States
- Denomination: Roman Catholic
- Website: croatianchurchnewyork.org

History
- Founded: 1886, 1913

Architecture
- Architect: George H. Streeton
- Style: Gothic Revival
- Years built: 1901–1903

Specifications
- Materials: Structural masonry Façade: Manhattan schist Red brick with stone trim

Administration
- Archdiocese: New York

The Catholic Church of Sts. Cyril & Methodius and St. Raphael in Manhattan, New York City has since 1974 been administered as the seat of a Croatian national parish. It offers services in Croatian as well as services in English.

Located at 502 West 41st Street, near the southwest corner of Tenth Avenue and an entrance to the Lincoln Tunnel, it was built from 1901 to 1903 as the Church of St. Raphael, for a different population: the poor Irish immigrants of the rough neighborhood known as Hell's Kitchen.

== Church of St. Raphael before 1974 ==
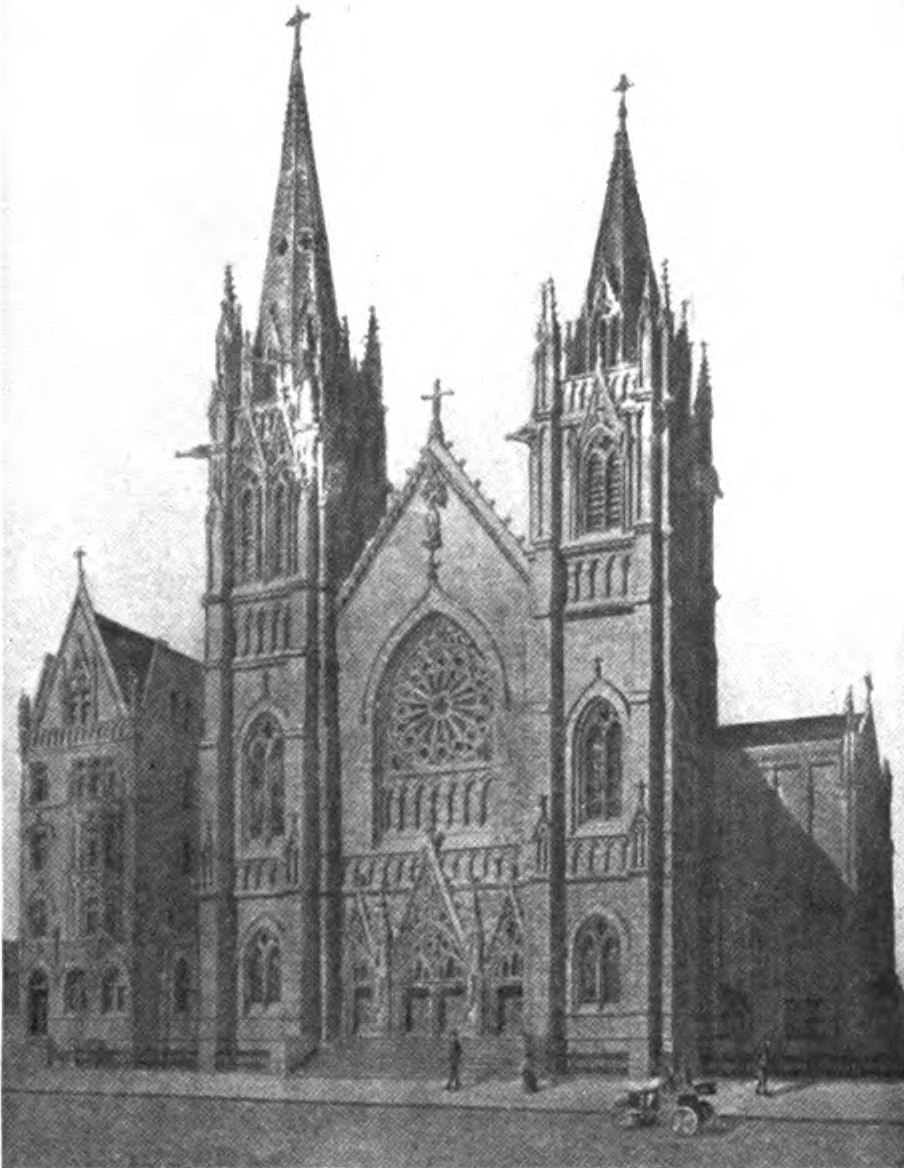
The church as it appeared in 1914.

In 1886 the territory extending from 34th to 44th Streets, west of 10th Avenue, was separated by the Archdiocese of New York from St. Michael's and Holy Cross parishes and formed into the new parish of St. Raphael, which was incorporated May 4 of that year. A building at 509 West 40th Street, in back of the present church, was rented and fitted up to serve as a temporary church by Rev. John A. Gleeson, the first pastor. Two years later, an adjacent soda-water factory at 503 West 40th Street was converted into a 600-seat chapel to relieve overcrowding and provide a Sunday school for children. In September 1890, Fr. Gleeson was named pastor of St. Michael's Church, and Rev. Malick A. Cunnion succeeded to the pastorate of St. Raphael's.

Ground was broken for the present edifice in June 1901, and the ceremonial cornerstone was laid October 26, 1902, with Archbishop John Farley officiating. The New York Times reported that several thousand persons watched the ceremony, many from windows, fire escapes, and rooftops, "and the entire neighborhood was decorated with flags and bunting in honor of the event."

The church was designed by New York architect George H. Streeton in the French Gothic style. Its twin-towered front is composed of Manhattan schist trimmed with limestone; the rest of the church is red brick trimmed with granite. The church is 75 feet wide, 140 feet deep, and 160 feet high. A rectory, also by Streeton, was built adjacent to it, on the church's east side.

Archbishop Farley preached at St. Raphael's Church at a special Sunday Mass for businessmen, in the middle of the banking Panic of 1907, urging them to reassure the public that the banks were solvent.

In 1908 Father Cunnion's health began to fail, and he was unable to complete the interior of the church. He died in 1914, and was succeeded by Rev. Michael J. Duffy, who was pastor until May 1935. At that time, owing to the decimation of the neighborhood by construction of the Lincoln Tunnel and the realignment of the West Side Line railroad tracks, St. Raphael's status changed from independent parish to mission of Holy Innocents Church, administered by its pastor, Rev. Aloysius C. Dineen. On November 8, 1936, the fiftieth anniversary of the parish was marked with a Mass at St. Raphael's celebrated by Cardinal Patrick Joseph Hayes, who referred sadly to the "recent difficulties" of the parish. A few years later, the parish merged with that of the Italian Church of St. Clare, 436–438 West 36th Street, which was demolished to make room for Dyer Avenue; the name St. Raphael's was retained.

== Croatian Parish ==
=== Background ===
A wave of European Catholics immigrated to the United States between 1840 and 1920, including Germans, Italians, Poles, Slovaks, and Croatians, and many Franciscan friars came from their home countries to minister to them in their own language.

By 1910, Manhattan Croatians were centered around 11th Avenue in the West 30s, 40s, and 50s. Many worked at the docks, rail yards, and factories nearby. Most spoke little English, but there were no Croatian churches, so few went to Mass. The church they founded three years later resulted largely from the efforts of two Franciscan priests, immigrants themselves.

Rev. Ambrozije, or Ambrose, Širca was born in Austria in 1877 and ordained in 1901. Upon arriving in New York in 1910, Fr. Širca was assigned by Archbishop Farley to seek community support for a Croatian parish. Though unsuccessful, he was able to preach at Mass in Croatian and perform marriages and christenings for Croatians at St. Clare's, with the support of the pastor, an Italian Franciscan. Simultaneously, he did the same for the Croatian community of Hoboken, New Jersey, in the Italian Church of St. Francis, whose pastor was also Franciscan. Fr. Širca kept parish records of Croatians in both churches. In August 1912 he left to serve the Slovak parish of St. Michael's in Rockland Lake, N.Y.

That year, Irenej, or Irenaeus, Petričak, a Croatian born in 1889, was a theology student in Zagreb, and was solicited by a Franciscan friar and missionary in America to travel there to serve his countrymen. After his ordination later in the year, he and an older priest, Rev. Placid Belavić, journeyed to New York City, arriving in 1913. They found that most of the city's Croats did not attend church, but those who did went to St. Clare's. Rev. Petričak met with the vicar general of the archdiocese, Mgr Joseph Mooney, who suggested the young priest arrange with St. Clare's pastor for a Sunday Mass in Croatian, to test the response. In the event, the church was filled to overflowing, with Mgr Mooney present. The day after his report, the archbishop granted Fr. Petričak permission to start his parish.

With representatives of various Croatian organizations, Fr. Petričak and Mgr Mooney canvassed the community. A church council was set up. They rented a small disused church at 552 West 50th St., empty save for the benches and a fine organ, for $100 a month. With donations of church necessities from other New York City churches, it took the Croatians of the community five weeks to renovate and refurbish the church, during which time St. Clare's continued to celebrate Mass in Croatian. It was named after Cyril and Methodius, the 9th-century Greek siblings called Apostles to the Slavs.

=== At the Church of Sts. Cyril and Methodius ===
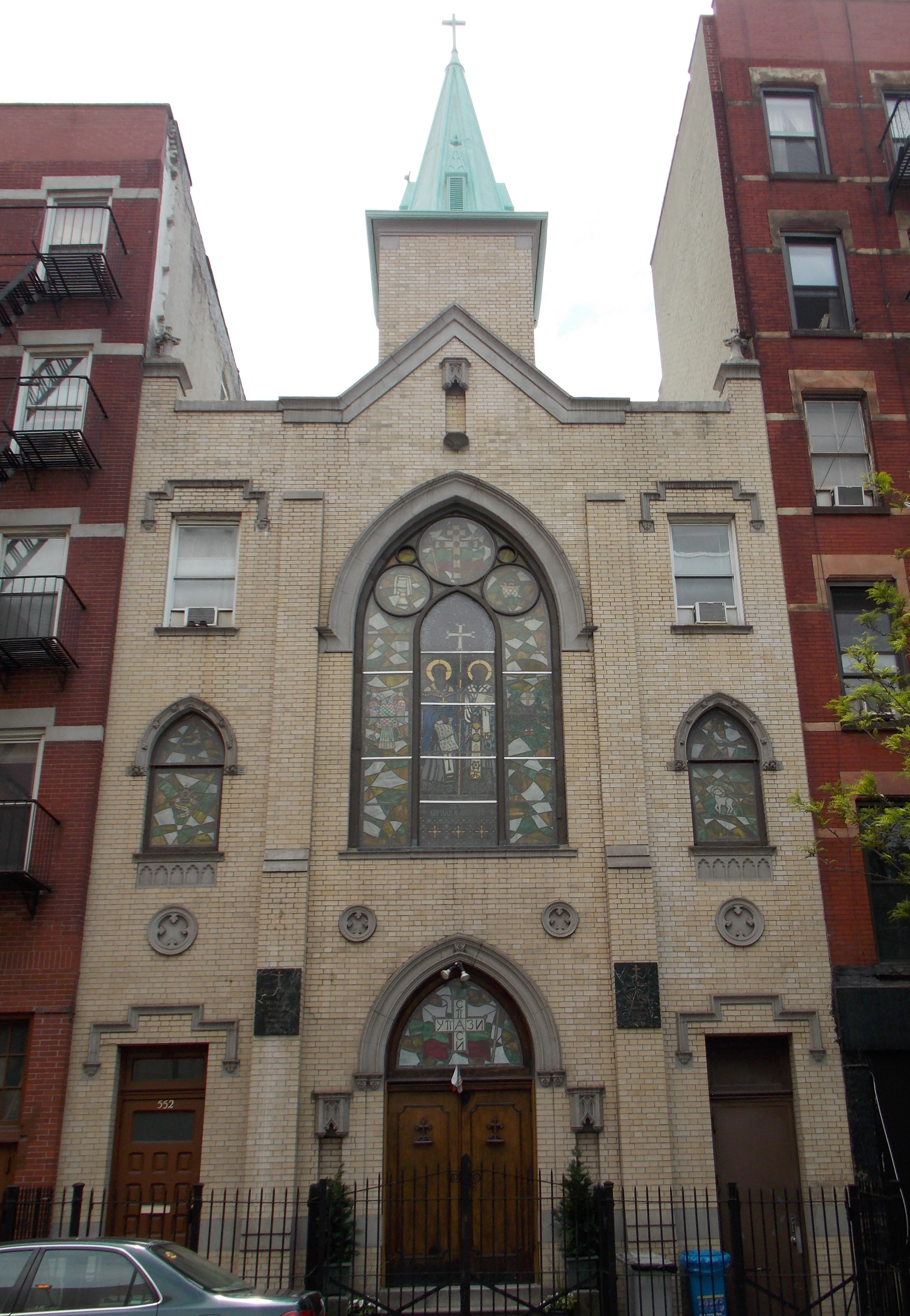
Saints Kyril & Metodi Bulgarian Eastern Orthodox Diocesan Cathedral, formerly Church of Sts. Cyril and Methodius

The opening ceremonies took place on Sunday, November 16, 1913. A tremendous downpour didn't prevent a huge procession of people displaying tricolors, accompanied by music, from marching up 11th Avenue toward the new church. The church was too small for the crowd; many had to stand outside during Mass. Mgr Mooney addressed those present, expressing his happiness, and people were jubilant.

The archives from Hoboken were sent over. To pay the rent and other expenses, money was borrowed from individuals and council members, and Fr. Petričak went door to door soliciting support. In addition, he visited the sick, elderly, and lonely. Fr. Belavić took care of the pastoral needs of the parish and delivered the sacraments. Early in 1914, the Franciscan elders called Fr. Širca back from Rockland Lake to take charge of the parish, with Fr. Petričak as his assistant. At that time, the congregation numbered 4,000.

Two years later, Fr. Širca was transferred to the Church of St. Jerome in Chicago, Illinois, and Fr. Petričak once again became pastor. In the meantime, money was raised to buy, enlarge, and repair the church and rectory, and install central heating and electricity, in order to properly conduct the growing religious and social activities of the new parish. Religious societies and a choir were started. More space was needed, so in 1923, the small church added a hall in the basement.

Fr. Petričak was transferred to a parish in Steelton, Pennsylvania, in 1926, and was succeeded by Rev. Franjo (Josip) Čuturić. When still more space was needed, Fr. Čuturić bought the building next door. Following World War II, a wave of Croatians fleeing Yugoslavia arrived in America by way of European refugee camps. In 1947, the church provided assistance to many hundreds of them.

Over the years, several orders of nuns successively supplied personnel to the Church of Sts. Cyril and Methodius. Nuns led the choir, ran the office, maintained the church buildings, visited the sick, and taught in the school, among many other activities. In 1971, nuns from Croatia belonging to the Franciscan Province of Christ the King in Herzegovina arrived to assist in the work of the parish.

=== At the Church of St. Raphael ===
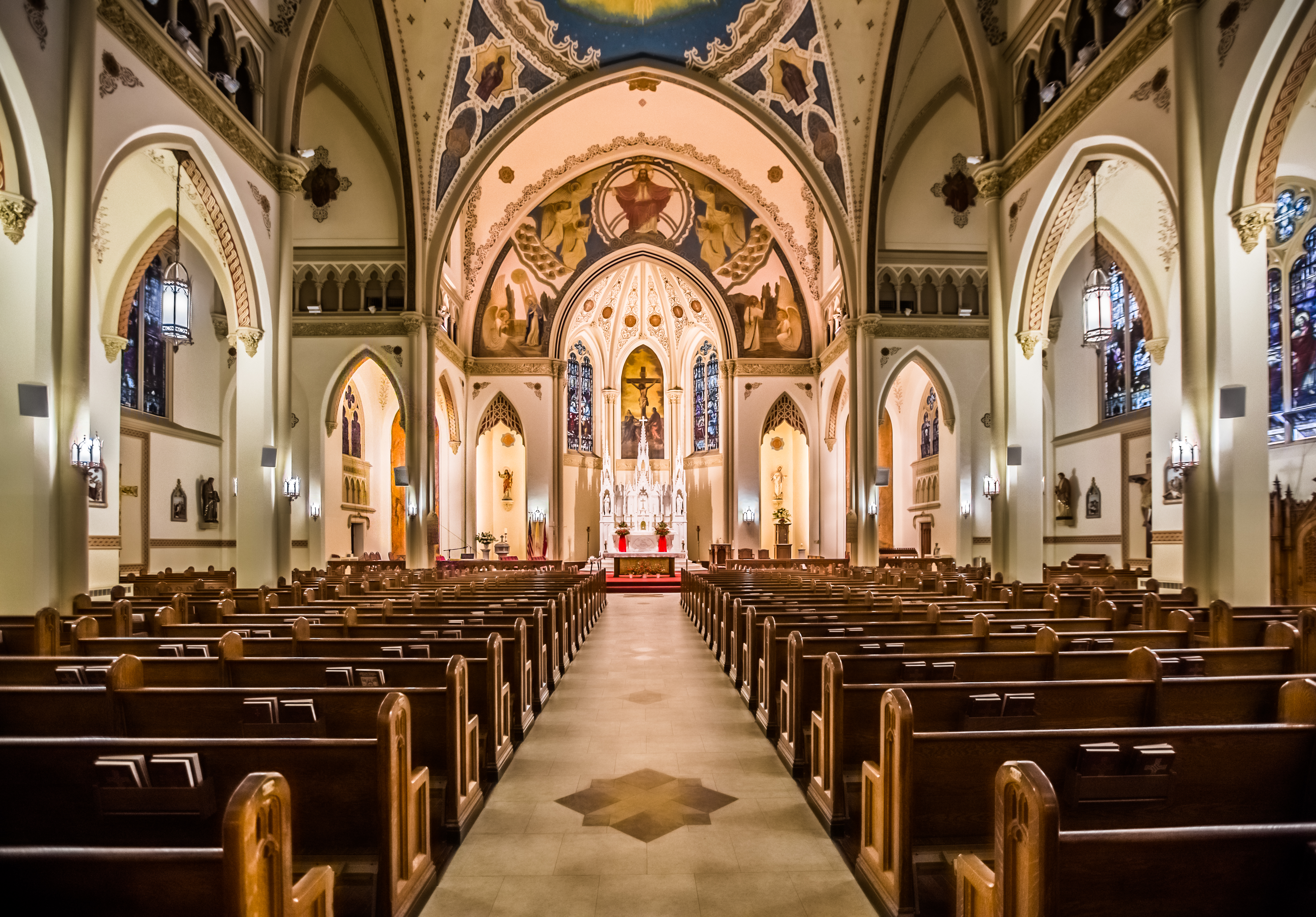
Interior of the Church of Sts. Cyril & Methodius and St. Raphael on June 9, 2018

By then, the needs of the parish had outgrown its space. It was given the opportunity to buy an old hall belonging to and behind St. Raphael's on 40th Street. The rundown facility, which had been used as a gymnasium, was redecorated with motifs of the homeland, and opened on October 24, 1971, as the St. Nikola Tavelić Croatian Center. The same year, the archdiocese granted permission for Sunday Mass celebrations in Croatian in St. Raphael's. After these Masses, the nuns began religious classes for children in the new Center. Soon, Cardinal Terence Cooke granted the Croats permission to take the church over. The Croatian church inherited all the archives, including those of St. Clare's, dating back to 1886.

The last Mass in the old church was celebrated on November 10, 1974. It was sold to the Bulgarian Eastern Orthodox Diocese of the US, Canada and Australia in 1979.

Past neglect of St. Raphael's Church necessitated three years of renovations. A celebratory parade, and a Mass led by Cardinal Cooke, marked their completion in July 1977. Five years later additional improvements were made, including installation of a new heating system. Reconstruction of the great hall under the church began in 1993 under pastor Rev. Slavko Soldo; it was completed in 1999 under pastor Rev. Marko Puljić.

In 1977, the church received a bust of Cardinal Aloysius Stepinac (May 8, 1898 – February 10, 1960), the Archbishop of Zagreb from 1937 until his death in 1960, by sculptor Ivan Meštrović. The church also displays the paintings Bozic and Kardinal Stepinac by Josip Crnobori and a wooden relief by Rev. Joakim Jaki Gregov. On February 10, 1980, the portion of 41st Street in front of the church was officially named Cardinal Stepinac Place by the City of New York, on the 20th anniversary of his death.

During the Bosnian War of the 1990s, the church served as a center of relief efforts.

The Church of Sts. Cyril & Methodius and St. Raphael is staffed by friars from the Chicago-based Custody of the Holy Family, which belongs to the Franciscan Province of Mostar in Bosnia and Herzegovina. As of January 25, 2016, the pastor is Rev. Nikola Pašalić, OFM; the vicars are Rev. Ilija Puljić, OFM, and Rev. Zeljko Barbaric, OFM; and the Franciscan Sisters of Christ the King are Sr. Anica Matic, Sr. Lidija Banozic, and Sr. Izabela Galic. Masses are celebrated Sundays at 9:00 A.M. and 11:00 A.M. in Croatian and 10:00 A.M. in English, and Tuesday–Saturday at 8:00 A.M. in Croatian.
