= Transfiguration Catholic Church (Queens) =

Roman Catholic church in Queens, New York City, USA

Coordinates: 40°43′27″N 73°54′05″W

Transfiguration Roman Catholic Church
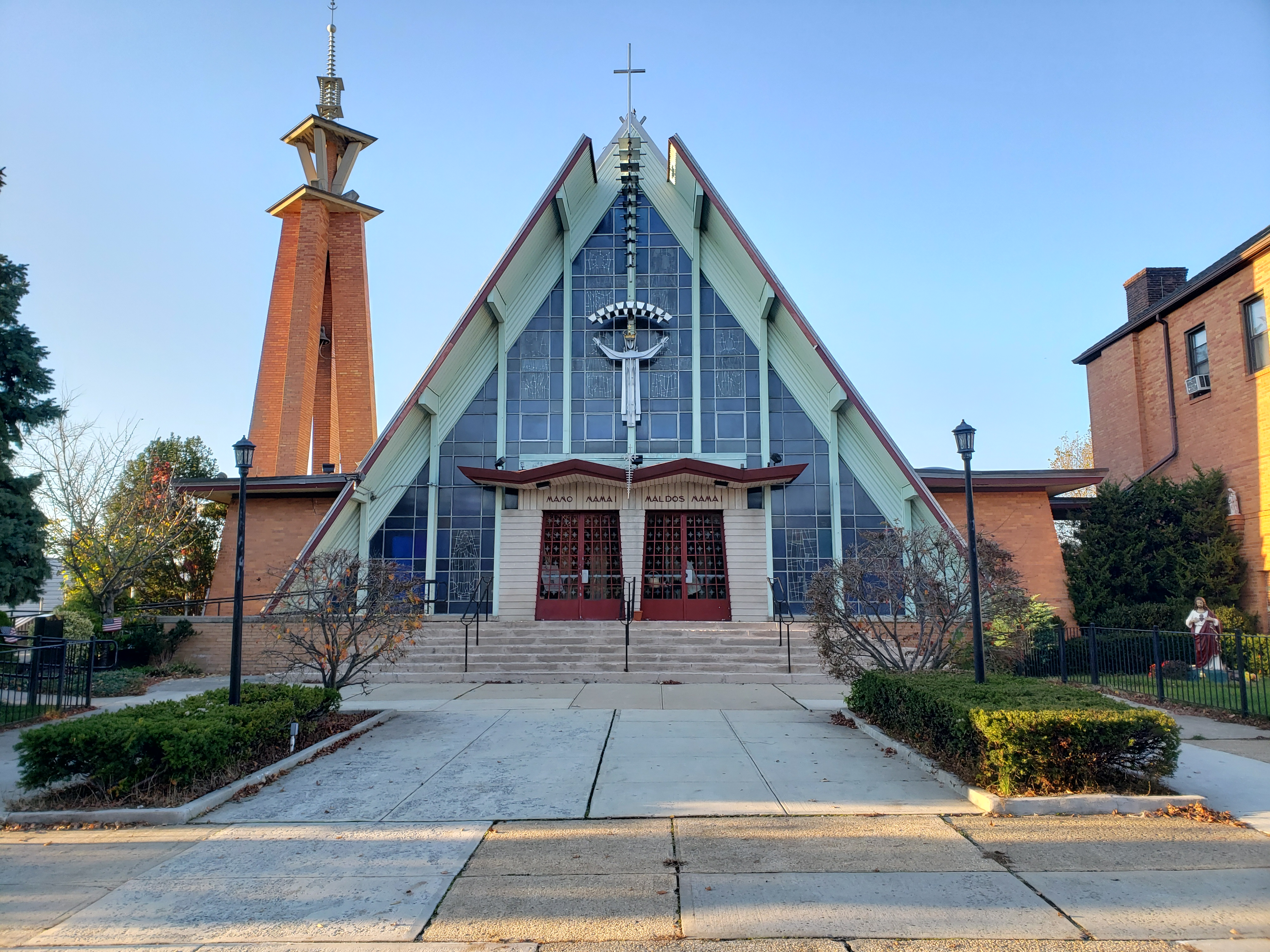
- Main façade of the Transfiguration Roman Catholic Church in Maspeth, Queens, New York.
- Interactive map of the Transfiguration Roman Catholic Church area

General information
- Architectural style: Modernist
- Location: Maspeth, Queens, New York, United States of America
- Construction started: 1956
- Completed: 1962

Design and construction
- Architect: Jonas Mulokas
- Main contractor: John Stankus

The Transfiguration Catholic Church, also known as Church of the Transfiguration, is a Roman Catholic church at 64-14 Clinton Avenue in Maspeth, Queens, New York City. Belonging to the Diocese of Brooklyn, its current pastor is Msgr Joseph P. Calise. Prior to its merger with St. Stanislaus Kostka, it was established as a Lithuanian parish. It is now part of the merged Parish of Saint Stanislaus Kostka - Transfiguration.

== History ==
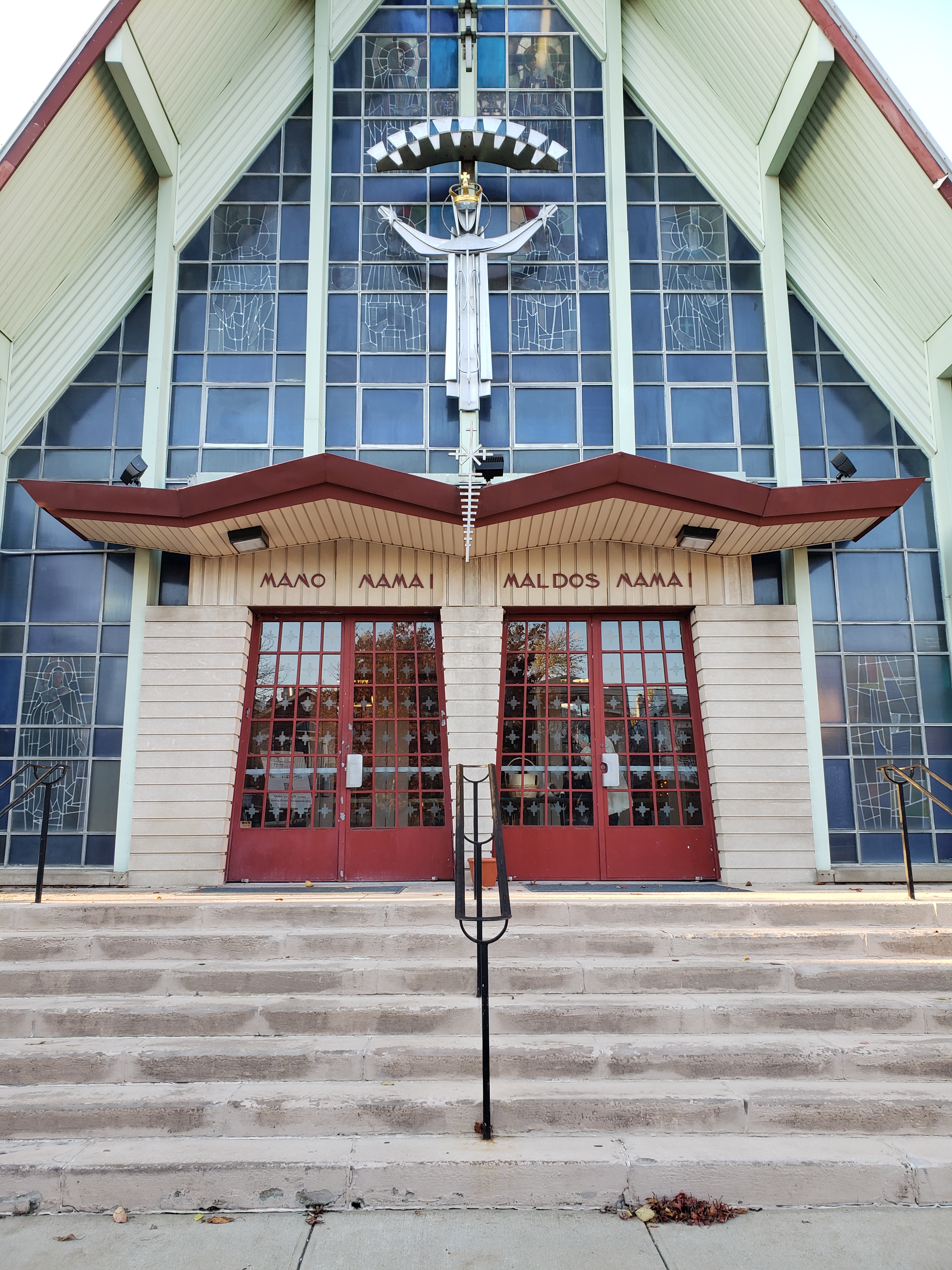
The religious phrase written in the Lithuanian language, Mano Namai Maldos Namai ("My house is a house of prayer") is displayed above the main entrance doors of the Transfiguration Roman Catholic Church in Maspeth, Queens, New York.

=== Original structures ===
Its parish was organized in 1908. Its first church building was erected in 1909 not on its current location but on Hull Avenue. The purpose of building it was to serve a community of Lithuanian immigrants who settled in Maspeth and the Blissville section of Long Island City. This original structure was destroyed by fire in 1925. The church was relocated to the former location of the old church building of St. Stanislaus Kostka Roman Catholic Church on Clinton Avenue, with its rear facade abutting Perry Avenue. St. Stanislaus Roman Catholic Church then moved to a new location on Maspeth Avenue and 61st Street. A new church building for the Transfiguration Roman Catholic Church was built in 1935.

=== Current structure ===
The present-day and modern-day looking structure was designed by Lithuanian architect Jonas Mulokas. Construction began in 1956 and the new structure was consecrated in 1962. The 1935 structure of the building was turned into parish hall. Above the doors of the church is a phrase in the Lithuanian language, Mano Namai Maldos Namai ("My house is a house of prayer").

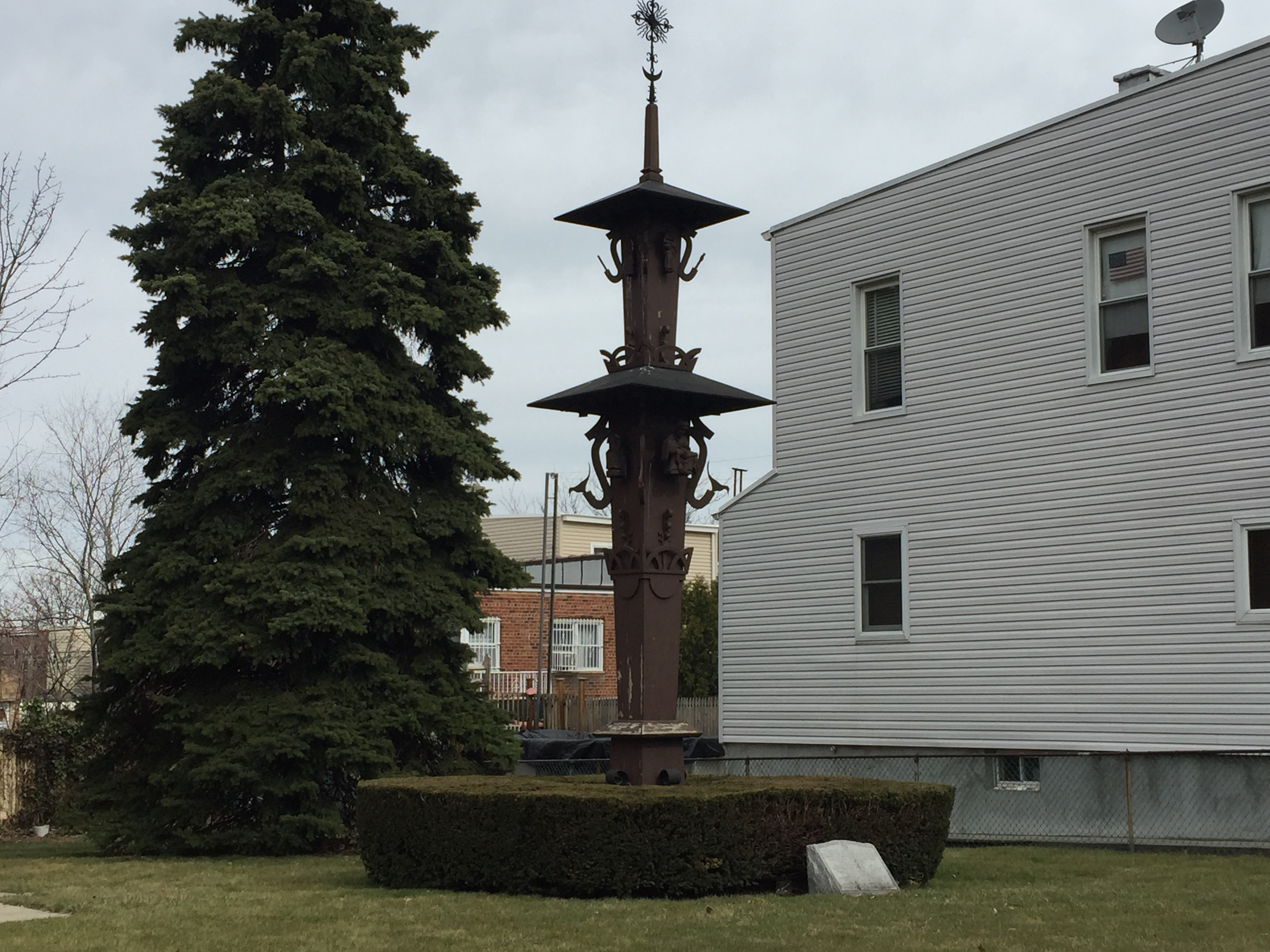
A replica of a Lithuanian roadside shrine within the yard of the Transfiguration Roman Catholic Church in Maspeth, Queens, New York.

At present, the church's front lawn houses within its yard a replica of a Lithuanian roadside shrine. The church structure has a steeple that looks like the said shrine. A distinctive feature of the interior of the church building are decorations influenced by Lithuanian folk art. Masses are currently held in Transfiguration Church in the English language on Saturday afternoons and Sunday mornings and in the Latin language on Sunday afternoons.

==== Recognition ====
The design is one of Mulokas' most recognized works, winning awards from the American Society of Registered Architects, the Queens Chamber of Commerce and was featured on the front page of the New York Times on December 2, 1962. More recently in 2025, Frampton Tolbert of Docomomo International described the church as "a little known modernist masterpiece of Lithuanian architecture" and "is undoubtedly the signature work of Mulokas’ career and the one that best expresses a pure blending of Lithuanian architecture and modernism."

== See also ==
- St. Mary's Catholic Church (Custer, Michigan), a similarly-designed church by Jonas Mulokas
- Holy Cross Roman Catholic Church (Maspeth, New York)
- St. Adalbert Roman Catholic Church
