= John Loughlin (bishop) =

Irish-born prelate

His Excellency, The Right Reverend John Loughlin
- Bishop of Brooklyn
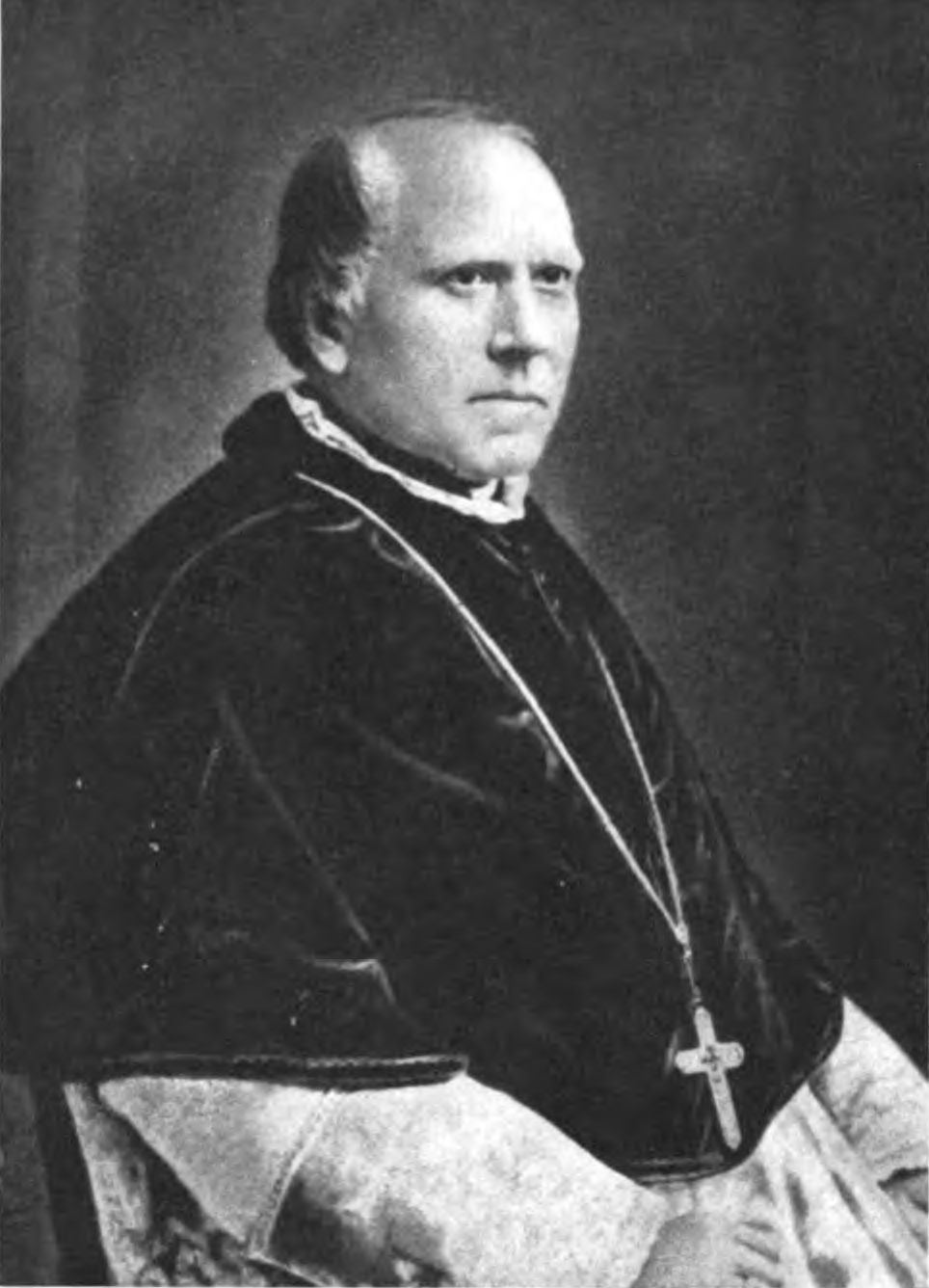
- Bishop Loughlin
- Diocese: Brooklyn
- In office: 1853 to 1891
- Successor: Charles Edward McDonnell

Orders
- Ordination: October 18, 1840 by John Hughes
- Consecration: October 30, 1853 by Gaetano Bedini

Personal details
- Born: December 20, 1817 Drumbonniff, County Down, Ireland
- Died: December 29, 1891 (aged 74) Brooklyn, New York, US
- Denomination: Roman Catholic Church

John Loughlin (December 20, 1817 – December 29, 1891) was an Irish-born prelate of the Roman Catholic Church. He served as the first bishop of Brooklyn in New York from 1853 until 1891.

== Early life ==
John Loughlin was born on December 20, 1817 in Drumbonniff, County Down, Ireland to John and Mary (née McNulty) Loughlin. When he was age six, the Loughlin family emigrated to the United States, settling in Albany, New York. Loughlin received his early education at the Albany Academy.

Deciding to become a priest, Loughlin at age 14 traveled to Chambly, Quebec to enter the minor seminary there. After three years at Chambly, he enrolled at Mount St. Mary's Seminary in Emmitsburg, Maryland.

== Priesthood ==
Loughlin was ordained to the priesthood for the Diocese of New York by Bishop John Hughes on October 18, 1840 at Old St. Patrick's Cathedral in Manhattan. After his ordination, he then served as a curate at St. John's Parish in Utica, New York, then part of the diocese. In 1841, the diocese transferred him to the Old St. Patrick's Cathedral Parish.

In 1850, Pope Pius IX raised the Diocese of New York to the Archdiocese of New York. That same year, Archbishop Hughes named Loughlin as his vicar general.

== Bishop of Brooklyn ==
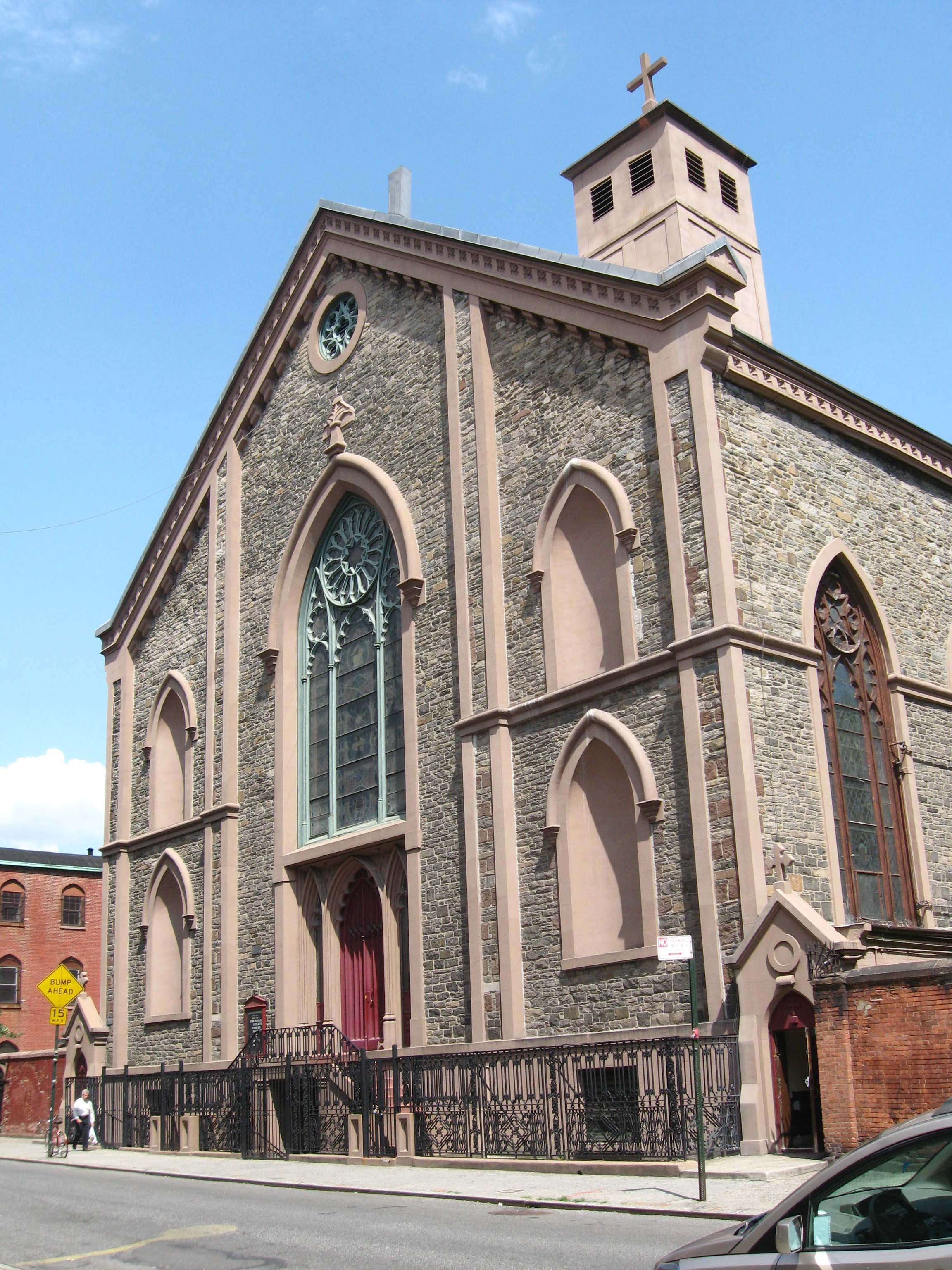
The Basilica of Old St. Patrick's Cathedral, New York City (2008)

On June 19, 1853, Loughlin was appointed the first bishop of the newly erected Diocese of Brooklyn by Pius IX. He received his episcopal consecration at the Old St. Patrick's Cathedral on October 30, 1853, from Archbishop Gaetano Bedini, with Bishops John McCloskey and Louis Amadeus Rappe serving as co-consecrators.

During his 38-year-long tenure, the Catholic population of the diocese increased from about 15,000 to nearly 400,000. Loughlin erected 125 churches and chapels, 93 parochial schools, two colleges, 10 orphanages, five hospitals, two homes for the aged, a home for destitute boys, and a seminary. He erected the Chapel of the Resurrection at Holy Cross Cemetery in Brooklyn in 1855.

In 1861, Loughlin expressed his support for the federal government at the start of the American Civil War. He attended the Plenary Councils of Baltimore in Baltimore, Maryland (1852, 1866, 1884) as well as the First Vatican Council (1869–1870) in Rome, where he was named an assistant at the pontifical throne.

=== Death and legacy ===
Loughlin died at his residence in Brooklyn, New York, aged 74.Bishop Loughlin Memorial High School in Brooklyn is named for him.

Catholic Church titles
Preceded by None	Bishop of Brooklyn; 1853–1891	Succeeded by Charles Edward McDonnell
