= St. Adalbert Roman Catholic Church =

Church in New York City

Coordinates: 40.732393°N 73.882858°W

Saint Adalbert Roman Catholic Church
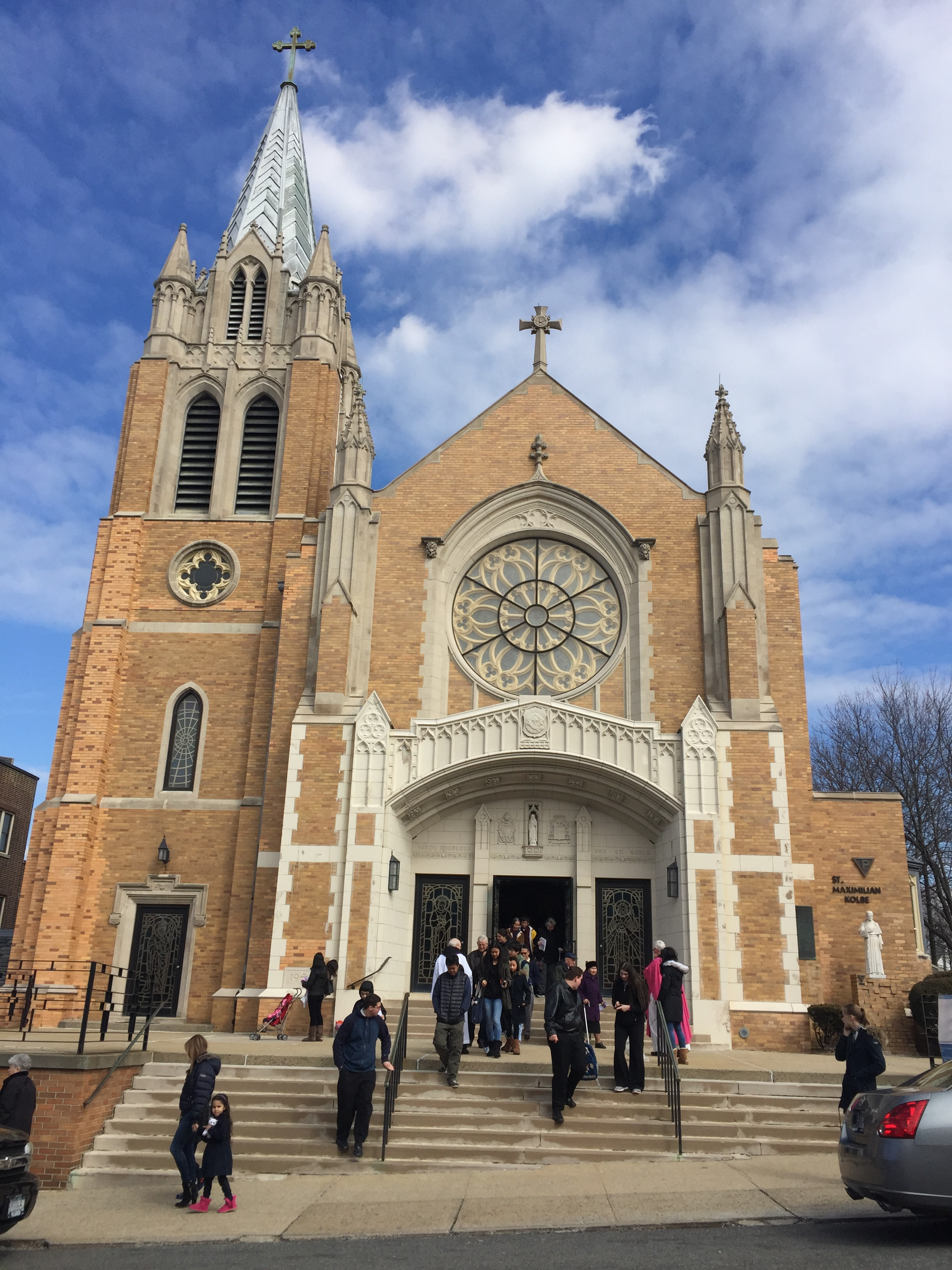
- Parishioners exiting after mass from the Saint Adalbert Roman Catholic Church at Elmhurst, Queens, New York. Parishioners are being greeted by priests.
- Interactive map of the Saint Adalbert Roman Catholic Church area

General information
- Location: Elmhurst, Queens, New York, United States of America

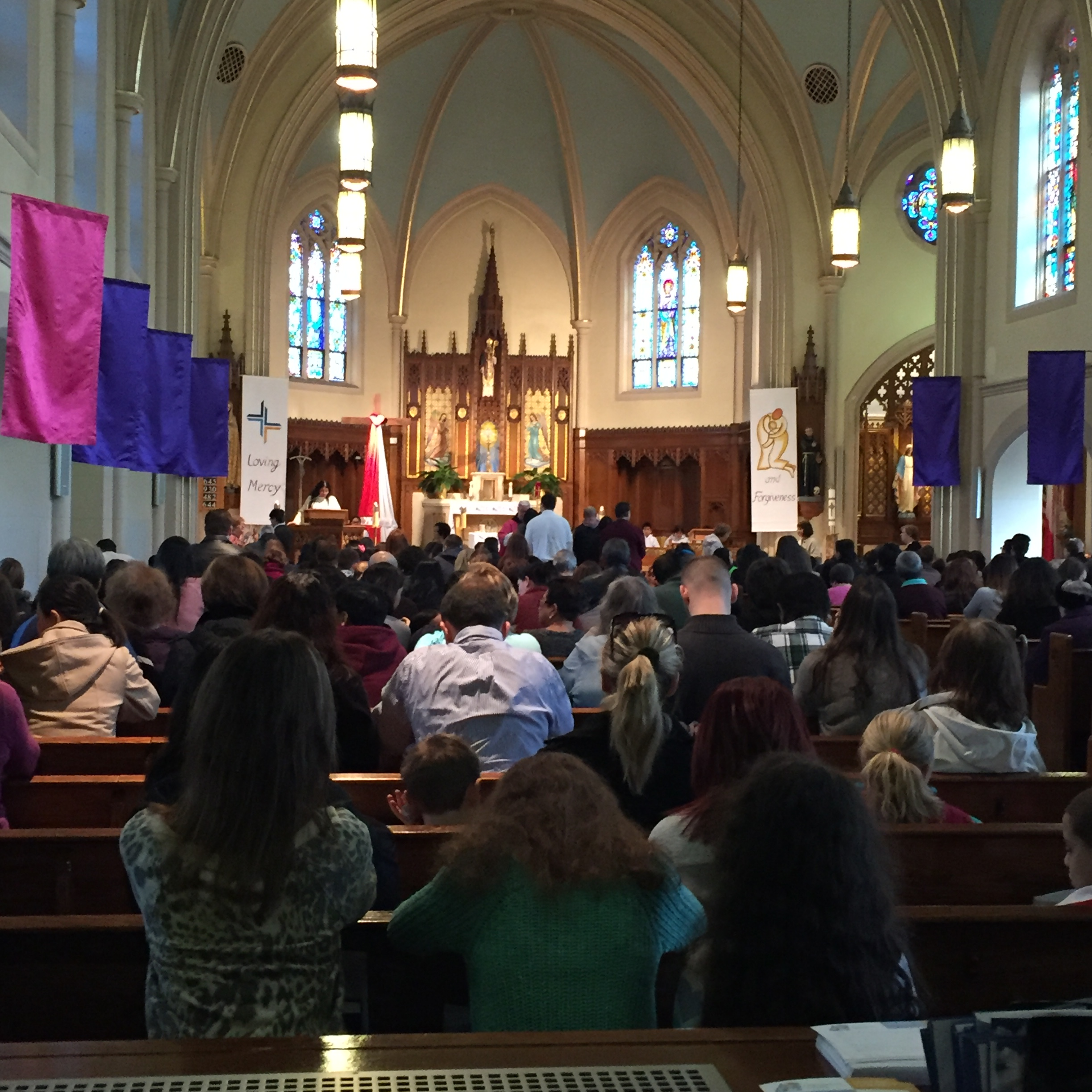
Parishioners attending mass during communion time inside the Saint Adalbert Roman Catholic Church

The Saint Adalbert Roman Catholic Church is a Roman Catholic church at 52-29 83rd Street in Elmhurst, Queens, New York. It was founded in November 1892 primarily to serve immigrants from Poland who settled in the areas of Elmhurst, Maspeth and neighboring villages.

== History ==
=== Church ===
The first parishioners of the church were initially served by priests who are speakers of the Polish language and of priests of Polish descent since 1891. The first was Father Joseph Fyda. Father Fyda was succeeded by Reverend Monsignor Boleslaus Puchalski. Other priests who served the church included Reverend Doctor Adalbert Nawrocki and Monsignor Wladyslaw Manka. The parish was transferred to the management of Franciscan Friars Minor Conventual in 1906.

It still has staff who speak Polish despite its diverse parishioners at present. As of 2026, the parish offered three masses in Polish, including a Sunday mass.

The church's current structure was built in 1947.

=== School ===
St. Adalbert Catholic Academy, originally named St. Adalbert Catholic School, which was established in 1892 and was also run by the church, until it was taken over by the Diocese of Brooklyn and became known as St. Adalbert Catholic Academy.

== See also ==
- Holy Cross Roman Catholic Church (Maspeth, New York)
- Our Lady of the Miraculous Medal Church
- Transfiguration Roman Catholic Church
