= Holy Cross Roman Catholic Church (Queens) =

Church in Queens, New York

Coordinates: 40°43′28.7″N 73°54′13.0″W

- Interactive map of the Holy Cross Roman Catholic Church area

General information
- Location: Maspeth, Queens, New York, United States of America
- Construction started: 1913

The Holy Cross Roman Catholic Church, also known as the Church of the Holy Cross, is a Roman Catholic church located at 61-21 56th Road in Maspeth, Queens, New York City. It is considered one of the national churches within the geographical area. Historically, the purpose of establishing the church and its parish in 1912 was to provide spiritual services to early immigrants from Poland. It once had a school known as the Holy Cross School.

== History ==
Its parish was organized in 1908 as the Society of St. Joseph. The leader of the parish in 1912 was Reverend Adalbert Nawrocki (its first pastor, also known as Rev. Wojciech Nawrocki), when plans were made for the building of the church itself. Its first parishioners had to visit their then bishop 26 times before their wish to erect a church building was granted at the cost of around US$75,000. Its cornerstone was laid on June 22, 1913, and was completed after five months.

== Architecture ==
Dedicated on November 30, 1913, the church was built based on Roman-style design. It can seat 800 persons. It has three altars made of marble, stained-glass windows, Stations of the Cross and features two sacristies. It has a tower belfry with a chime of bells. Its school was a stone structure with eight classrooms that could accommodate 1600 children altogether. It also had a gymnasium, rooms for the Sokoly Society and other activities.

The AIA's Guide to New York City comments of the building that, "the voluptuous curvilinear verdigris copper steeple makes this church extraordinary. Disney must be jealous."

== Organ ==
The church features a Wurlitzer or theatre-style organ, a pipe organ built by George H. Ryder (from Boston, Massachusetts) Opus 63 in circa 1878 and was rebuilt by Bozeman-Gibson (from Deerfield, New Hampshire) in 1973. The organ was formerly built for the Bethel AME Church in New Bedford, Massachusetts.

== See also ==
- St. Stanislaus Kostka Roman Catholic Church (Maspeth)
- Transfiguration Roman Catholic Church
- St. Adalbert Roman Catholic Church
