= James Massa =

American prelate

His Excellency, The Most Reverend James Massa
- Auxiliary Bishop of Brooklyn; Titular Bishop of Bardstown
- Church: Roman Catholic Church
- Archdiocese: New York
- Diocese: Brooklyn
- Appointed: May 19, 2015
- Installed: July 20, 2015
- Other post: Titular Bishop of Bardstown

Orders
- Ordination: October 25, 1986 by Francis Mugavero
- Consecration: July 20, 2015 by Nicholas Anthony DiMarzio, William Murphy, Raymond Chappetto

Personal details
- Born: September 3, 1960 (age 66) Jersey City, New Jersey, US
- Education: Boston College; Yale Divinity School; Fordham University
- Motto: Ut omnes unum sint (They may all be one)

Styles of James Massa
- Reference style: His Excellency; The Most Reverend
- Spoken style: Your Excellency
- Religious style: Bishop

James Massa (born September 3, 1960) is an American prelate of the Roman Catholic Church. He has been serving as an auxiliary bishop of the Diocese of Brooklyn in New York City since 2015 and as rector of St. Joseph Seminary in Yonkers, New York since 2020.

== Biography ==
=== Early life ===
James Massa was born on September 3, 1960, in Jersey City, New Jersey to Andrew and Irene Gilbert Massa. Having decided to become a priest, James Massa attended Boston College in Boston Massachusetts, receiving a Bachelor of Arts degree in theology and history in 1982. He continued his education at the Yale Divinity School in New Haven, Connecticut, where he received a Master of Theology degree in 1985.

=== Priesthood ===
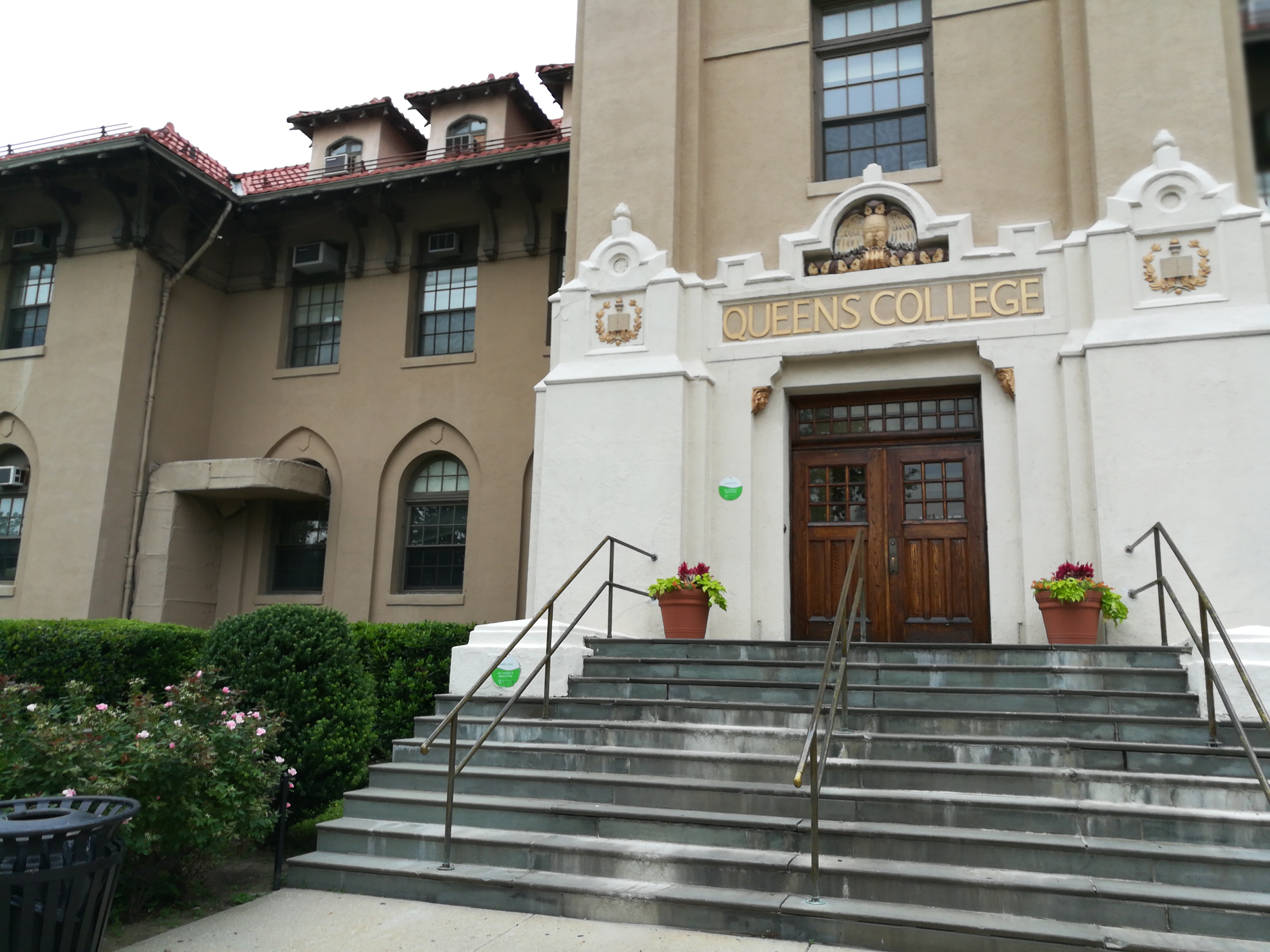
Queens College, City University of New York (2017)

Massa was ordained a priest for the Diocese of Brooklyn at St. Theresa's Church in Woodside New York, on Oct. 25, 1986 by Bishop Francis Mugavero. After his ordination, the diocese assigned Massa to the following positions:

- Assistant pastor at Our Lady Queen of Martyrs Parish in Forest Hills, New York (1986 to 1990). He also served as an adjunct professor at Saint John's University in Queens, New York (1987 to 1989)
- Chaplain at Queens College, City University of New York in Queens (1990 to 1993)
- Chaplain and professor at Newman University in Wichita, Kansas (1993 to 1996)
- Professor at Pope St. John XXIII National Seminary in Weston, Massachusetts (1997 to 2001), Massa received his Doctor of Systematic Theology degree from Fordham University in New York City in 1997.
- Professor at the Seminary of the Immaculate Conception in Lloyd Harbor, New York, (2001 to 2005).

In 2005, Massa moved to Washington D.C. to serve as the executive director of the United States Conference of Catholic Bishops (USCCB) Secretariat for Ecumenical and Interreligious Dialogue. In 2008, after being appointed by Pope Benedict XVI as consultor to the Pontifical Council for Interreligious Dialogue, Massa went to Rome. He also served as a member of the Joint Working Group between the Vatican and the World Council of Churches.

After returned to Brooklyn in 2011, Massa helped coordinated the merger of the three seminaries in the Diocese of Rockville Centre, the Diocese of Brooklyn, and the Archdiocese of New York. He was assigned in 2012 as a faculty member at Saint Joseph Seminary in Yonkers, New York. Bishop Nicholas DiMarzio named Massa as moderator of the curia for the diocese and administrator of Holy Name Parish in Brooklyn in 2014.

=== Auxiliary Bishop of Brooklyn ===
Massa was appointed titular bishop of Bardstown and auxiliary bishop of Brooklyn on May 19, 2015, by, Pope Francis. He received his episcopal consecration by DiMarzio on July 20, 2015. In 2020, Massa was named rector of Saint Joseph. In addition to English, Massa speaks Spanish and German.

== See also ==
- Catholic Church hierarchy
- Catholic Church in the United States
- Historical list of the Catholic bishops of the United States
- List of Catholic bishops of the United States
- Lists of patriarchs, archbishops, and bishops

== Episcopal succession ==
Catholic Church titles
Preceded by –	Auxiliary Bishop of Brooklyn; 2015–present	Succeeded by -
