= Robert J. Brennan =

American Catholic prelate (born 1962)

His Excellency, The Most Reverend Robert J. Brennan
- Bishop of Brooklyn
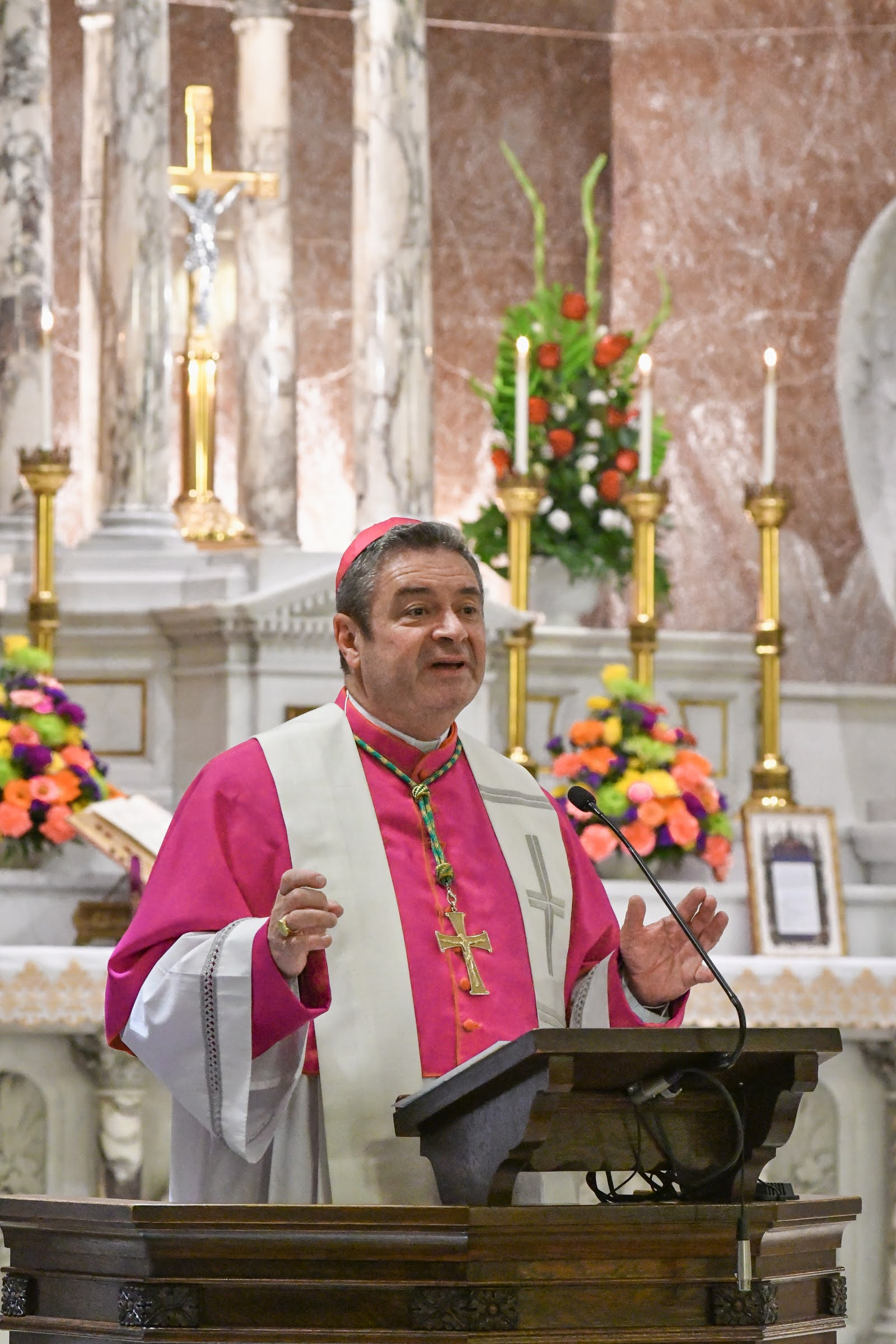
- Brennan in 2020
- Church: Catholic
- Diocese: Brooklyn
- Appointed: September 29, 2021
- Installed: November 30, 2021
- Predecessor: Nicholas Anthony DiMarzio
- Previous posts: Auxiliary Bishop of Rockville Centre & Titular Bishop of Erdonia (2012‍–‍2019); Bishop of Columbus (2019‍–‍2021)

Orders
- Ordination: May 27, 1989 by John R. McGann
- Consecration: July 25, 2012 by: William Francis Murphy; Charles J. Chaput; Paul Henry Walsh

Personal details
- Born: June 7, 1962 (age 64) The Bronx, New York, US
- Education: St. John's University; Seminary of the Immaculate Conception
- Motto: Thy will be done
- Styles
- Reference style: His Excellency; The Most Reverend
- Spoken style: Your Excellency
- Religious style: Bishop

Robert John Brennan (born June 7, 1962) is an American Catholic prelate who has served as bishop of Brooklyn in New York City since 2021. Previously, he served as an auxiliary bishop of the Diocese of Rockville Centre in New York State from 2012 to 2019, and as bishop of Columbus in Ohio from 2019 to 2021.

== Biography ==
=== Early life ===
Brennan was born on June 7, 1962, to Robert and Patricia Brennan in The Bronx, New York. He has two brothers and two sisters. His maternal grandfather was an immigrant from Ireland.

Brennan was raised in Lindenhurst, New York. He went to Our Lady of Perpetual Help Catholic School in Lindenhurst and then attended St. John the Baptist Diocesan High School in West Islip, New York. After finishing high school, Brennan entered St. John's University in Queens, where he received a Bachelor of Science degree in mathematics and computer science.

Having decided to become a priest, Brennan enrolled at the Seminary of the Immaculate Conception in Huntington, New York, where he was awarded a Master of Divinity degree.

=== Priesthood ===
Brennan was ordained a priest for the Diocese of Rockville Centre at St. Agnes Cathedral in Rockville Centre, New York, on May 27, 1989, by Bishop John R. McGann. Brennan's first pastoral assignment was at St. Patrick Parish in Smithtown, New York.

In 1994, McGann appointed Brennan as his priest-secretary. He continued in this role for Bishops James McHugh and William F. Murphy, while also providing pastoral service at St. Agnes Cathedral Parish. Brennan left this position in 2002 to become vicar general and moderator of the curia. In 2010, he was named pastor of St. Mary's Parish in Long Beach, New York.

=== Auxiliary Bishop of Rockville Centre ===
Coat of arms of Brennan as auxiliary bishop of Rockville Centre

Brennan was appointed titular bishop of Erdonia and auxiliary bishop of Rockville Centre on June 8, 2012, by Pope Benedict XVI. He received his episcopal consecration at St. Agnes Cathedral on July 25, 2012, from Bishop Murphy, with Archbishop Charles J. Chaput and Auxiliary Bishop Paul Henry Walsh acting as co-consecrators.

=== Bishop of Columbus ===
Coat of arms of Brennan as bishop of Columbus

Pope Francis appointed Brennan as bishop of Columbus on January 31, 2019. He was installed there on March 29, 2019. In August 2019, Brennan initiated with the Vatican the elevation of Saint Mary of the Assumption Church in Lancaster, Ohio, to the rank of a minor basilica.

In December 2020, Brennan announced the "Real Presence Real Future" strategic planning initiative for the diocese. He described it as "increasing the presence of Christ throughout its 23 counties over the next three years and upholding the Faith for future generations." The initiative involved grouping some parishes and closing others to deal with the shortage of priests in the diocese. Diocesan officials termed the initiative a hallmark of Brennan's tenure as bishop in Columbus.

In December 2020, Brennan condemned the shooting of Casey Goodson by police in Columbus.

=== Bishop of Brooklyn ===
On September 29, 2021, Francis accepted the resignation of Bishop Nicholas DiMarzio of Brooklyn and named Brennan to succeed him. Brennan was installed by Cardinal Timothy Dolan on November 30, 2021, at the Co-Cathedral of St. Joseph in Brooklyn. Brennan's motto, "Thy Will Be Done," a passage from the Lord's Prayer, is engraved on the headstone of his grandfather, and was on a prayer card that he kept until his death.

=== Controversy over music video ===
In 2023, the American singer-songwriter Sabrina Carpenter filmed a music video for her song "Feather" inside the Annunciation of the Blessed Virgin Mary Church. The video showed Carpenter dancing around the sanctuary with several items on the altar, while appearing with "no pants". Two days after the video's release, Brennan issued a statement that he was "appalled" by what was filmed inside the church. He indicated that the parish did not adhere to the diocesan policy on filming within church grounds, which requires a review of the scenes and script.

The administrative duties of Monsignor Jamie J. Gigantiello, as vicar for development, who permitted Carpenter's team to shoot inside the church, were subsequently terminated. Gigantiello's administrative oversight as pastor of the Our Lady of Mount Carmel-Annunciation Parish was also delegated to Auxiliary Bishop Witold Mroziewski. While some parishioners and Catholics supported Gigantiello and believed the punishment was too harsh, others were offended by his actions.

Initially, Gigantiello defended his decision, stating that he had approved the filming because his online search about Carpenter did not reveal anything worrisome, and that he wanted to increase the church's appeal to youth. Gigantiello later apologized for allowing the shoot, stating that he was informed that a funeral scene would be filmed inside the church, but believed most of it would be done outside the church building and that Carpenter's team did not appropriately represent the video's content.

On November 4, 2023, Brennan celebrated a Mass of Reparation, to "restore the sanctity of this church and repair the harm." Carpenter responded, stating advance permission was granted and noting that "Jesus was a carpenter."

In September 2024, an investigation into Gigantiello uncovered evidence that led to the indictment of New York City mayor Eric Adams.

== See also ==
- Catholic Church in the United States
- Hierarchy of the Catholic Church
- Historical list of the Catholic bishops of the United States
- List of Catholic bishops in the United States
- Lists of popes, patriarchs, primates, archbishops, and bishops

Catholic Church titles
Preceded by Roberto Calara Mallari	Titular See of Erdonia; 2012–2019	Succeeded by Gerardo Joseph Colacicco
Preceded by –	Auxiliary Bishop of Rockville Centre; 2012–2019	Succeeded by –
Preceded by Frederick Francis Campbell	Bishop of Columbus; 2019–2021	Succeeded by Earl Kenneth Fernandes
Preceded by Nicholas Anthony DiMarzio	Bishop of Brooklyn; 2021–present	Succeeded by Incumbent
