= Paul Sanchez (bishop) =

American prelate (born 1946)

His Excellency, The Most Reverend Paul Robert Sanchez
- Auxiliary Bishop Emeritus of Brooklyn; Titular Bishop of Coeliana
- Church: Roman Catholic Church
- Archdiocese: New York
- Diocese: Brooklyn
- Appointed: May 2, 2012
- Installed: July 11, 2012
- Retired: March 30, 2022
- Predecessor: Francesco Coccopalmerio
- Other post: Titular Bishop of Coeliana

Orders
- Ordination: December 17, 1971 by James Aloysius Hickey
- Consecration: July 11, 2012 by Nicholas Anthony DiMarzio, Frank Joseph Caggiano, and Octavio Cisneros

Personal details
- Born: November 26, 1946 (age 79) Brooklyn, New York, US
- Motto: God's grace is sufficient

Ordination history
History
Episcopal consecration
- Consecrated by: Nicholas Anthony DiMarzio
Styles of Paul Robert Sanchez
- Reference style: His Excellency; The Most Reverend
- Spoken style: Your Excellency
- Religious style: Bishop

Paul Robert Sanchez (born November 26, 1946) is an American prelate of the Roman Catholic Church who served as an auxiliary bishop for the Diocese of Brooklyn in New York City from 2012 to 2022.

== Biography ==
=== Early life ===
Paul Sanchez was born in Brooklyn, New York, on November 26, 1946. He attended St. Vincent Ferrer High School in Manhattan, Cathedral Preparatory Seminary in Queens, New York, and Cathedral College of the Immaculate Conception in Douglaston, New York. Sanchez then entered St. Bonaventure University in Saint Bonaventure, New York.

=== Priesthood ===
Sanchez was ordained into the priesthood by then Bishop James Hickey for the Diocese of Brooklyn on December 17, 1971. Sanchez holds a Bachelor of Sacred Theology degree and a Licentiate in Sacred Theology from the Pontifical Gregorian University in Rome. Sanchez also served as the episcopal vicar of Queens. He also earned a Master of Liturgical Studies degree from the University of Notre Dame in Indiana. Sanchez's pastoral assignments in New York City included:

- Parochial vicar of Our Lady of Mercy Parish in Forest Hills, St. Michael Parish in Flushing, and St. Sebastian Parish in Woodside
- Pastor of St. Agatha Parish in Brooklyn and Our Lady of Mount Carmel Parish in Queens

=== Auxiliary Bishop of Brooklyn ===
Sanchez was appointed titular bishop of Coeliana and auxiliary bishop of the Diocese of Brooklyn on May 2, 2012, by Benedict XVI. He was consecrated by Bishop Nicholas DiMarzio on July 11, 2012. As auxiliary bishop, Sanchez also served as the pastor of Our Lady, Queen of Martyrs Parish in Forest Hills. Sanchez was an adjunct instructor of theology at Saint John's University and the Seminary of the Immaculate Conception in Huntington, New York.

=== Retirement ===
On reaching age 75, Sanchez sent a letter of retirement as auxiliary bishop of Brooklyn to Pope Francis. The pope accepted his retirement on March 30, 2022.

== See also ==
- Roman Catholic Diocese of Brooklyn
- Catholic Church hierarchy
- Catholic Church in the United States
- Historical list of the Catholic bishops of the United States
- List of Catholic bishops of the United States
- Lists of patriarchs, archbishops, and bishops

== Episcopal succession ==
Catholic Church titles
Preceded by Francesco Coccopalmerio	Roman Catholic Titular See of Coeliana; 2012 – Present	Succeeded by Incumbent
