= Edmund Joseph Reilly =

American prelate

- Auxiliary Bishop of Brooklyn
- In office: 1955-1958

Orders
- Ordination: April 1, 1922
- Consecration: June 7, 1955 by Archbishop Thomas Edmund Molloy

Personal details
- Born: March 25, 1897 Queens, New York
- Died: November 3, 1958 (aged 61) Our Lady of Angels
- Denomination: Roman Catholic
- Education: Cathedral College
- Alma mater: St. John's Seminary

Edmund Joseph Reilly (March 25, 1897—November 3, 1958) was an American prelate of the Roman Catholic Church. He served as an auxiliary bishop of the Diocese of Brooklyn from 1955 until his death in 1958.

== Biography ==
Edmund Reilly was born in the College Point section of Queens, New York. He studied at Cathedral College and St. John's Seminary, both in Brooklyn. He was ordained to the priesthood on April 1, 1922. His first assignment was as a curate at St. James Cathedral, where he remained until 1943.

He was named a papal chamberlain in 1938, and raised to the rank of domestic prelate in 1940. He became pastor of St. Thomas Aquinas Church in Flatbush from 1943. In 1946, he was transferred to Our Lady of Angels Church in Bay Ridge. He also served as diocesan master of ceremonies.

On March 15, 1955, Reilly was appointed auxiliary bishop of Brooklyn and titular bishop of Nepte by Pope Pius XII. He received his episcopal consecration on the following June 7 from Archbishop Thomas Edmund Molloy, with Bishops Raymond Augustine Kearney and John Joseph Boardman serving as co-consecrators. As an auxiliary bishop, he continued to serve as pastor of Our Lady of Angels, a post which he held until his death three years later.

He died from a heart attack at the rectory of Our Lady of Angels, at age 61.

Catholic Church titles
Preceded by –	Auxiliary Bishop of Brooklyn; 1955 – 1958	Succeeded by –
