= Immaculate Conception Seminary =

Immaculate Conception Seminary may refer to:

- Seminary of the Immaculate Conception, in Huntington, New York
- Immaculate Conception Seminary School of Theology, in South Orange, New Jersey, part of Seton Hall University
