= Paul Sanchez (disambiguation) =

Paul Sanchez is an American guitarist and a singer-songwriter.

Paul Sanchez may also refer to:

- Paul Sanchez (bishop) (born 1946), American prelate of the Roman Catholic Church
- Paul Sanchez IV, American filmmaker
