= Raymond Chappetto =

American prelate

His Excellency, The Most Reverend Raymond Chappetto
- Auxiliary Bishop Emeritus of Brooklyn
- Church: Catholic
- Diocese: Brooklyn
- Appointed: May 2, 2012
- Installed: July 11, 2012
- Retired: March 7, 2022
- Other post: Titular Bishop of Citium (2012 - )

Orders
- Ordination: May 29, 1971 by Francis Mugavero
- Consecration: July 11, 2012 by Nicholas Anthony DiMarzio, Frank Joseph Caggiano, and Octavio Cisneros

Personal details
- Born: August 20, 1945 (age 80) Astoria, New York, US
- Motto: An instrument of your peace
Styles of Raymond Chappetto
- Reference style: His Excellency; The Most Reverend
- Spoken style: Your Excellency
- Religious style: Bishop

Raymond Francis Chappetto (born August 20, 1945) is an American Catholic prelate who was an auxiliary bishop of the Diocese of Brooklyn in New York City from 2012 to 2022.

== Biography ==
=== Early life ===
Raymond Chappetto was born on August 20, 1945, in Astoria, New York. Chappetto attended Our Lady of Mount Carmel School in Astoria, then entered Cathedral Preparatory Seminary in Brooklyn for his high school studies. He then attended Cathedral College of the Immaculate Conception in Brooklyn.

Chappetto earned a Master of Divinity degree from Our Lady of the Angels Seminary in Albany, New York. He also holds a Master of Religious Studies degree from Saint John's University in New York City.

=== Priesthood ===
Chappetto was ordained a priest for the Diocese of Brooklyn by Bishop Francis Mugavero at the Cathedral Basilica of St. James in Brooklyn on May 29, 1971. After his ordination, the diocese assigned Chappetto as parochial vicar of several parishes in the Borough of Queens in New York City:

- Saint Camillus in Rockaway Park, 1971 to 1975
- St. Pius V in Jamaica, 1975 to 1976
- Incarnation in Queens Village 1976 to 1981
- St. Helen in Howard Beach 1981 to 1983

Chappetto started his 12-year association with Our Lady of Miracles in Canarsie, Brooklyn, in 1983, first as a member of the team ministry and then as pastor. In 1995, he left Our Lady of Miracles to become episcopal vicar of Brooklyn West. In 1999, Chappetto was assigned as pastor of Our Lady of the Snows Parish in North Floral, Queens.

While at Our Lady of the Snows, he also served as minister for priests and in 2009 was named vicar for clergy and consecrated life. In 2012, after 13 years at Our Lady of the Snows, Chappetto was transferred to be pastor of St. Kevin's Parish in Flushing, Queens.

=== Auxiliary Bishop of Brooklyn ===
Chappetto was appointed titular bishop of Citium and auxiliary bishop of Brooklyn on May 2, 2012, by Pope Benedict XVI. He was consecrated by Bishop Nicholas DiMarzio on July 11, 2012. As auxiliary bishop, Chappetto served as the pastor of St. Kevin Parish in Flushing along with vicar general and vicar for clergy and consecrated life for the diocese

=== Retirement ===
Francis accepted Chappetto's resignation on March 7, 2022. Two days after, the Vatican commissioned an investigation into Chappetto. He was accused of withholding a memo concerning possible sexual abuse by a diocesan priest. The Vatican was conducting the Chappetto inquiry under the motu proprio Vos estis lux mundi, the papal order that governs how bishops handle sexual abuse allegations. In May 2023, after a thorough investigation, the Dicastery for Bishops determined that the allegations were "manifestly unfounded" and the case was closed.
