= Octavio Cisneros =

Cuban-American Catholic bishop

His Excellency, The Most Reverend Octavio Cisneros
- Auxiliary Bishop Emeritus of Brooklyn; Titular Bishop of Eanach Dúin
- Church: Roman Catholic Church
- Archdiocese: New York
- Diocese: Brooklyn
- Appointed: June 6, 2006
- Installed: August 22, 2006
- Retired: October 30, 2020
- Other post: Titular Bishop of Eanach Dúin

Orders
- Ordination: May 29, 1971 by Francis Mugavero
- Consecration: August 22, 2006 by Nicholas Anthony DiMarzio, Thomas Vose Daily, and Ignatius Anthony Catanello

Personal details
- Born: July 19, 1945 (age 80) Las Villas, Cuba
Styles of Octavio Cisneros
- Reference style: His Excellency; The Most Reverend
- Spoken style: Your Excellency
- Religious style: Bishop

Octavio Cisneros (born July 19, 1945) is a Cuban-born American prelate of the Roman Catholic Church. He served as an auxiliary bishop of the Diocese of Brooklyn in New York City from 2006 to 2020.

== Early life ==
The third of four children, Octavio Cisneros was born on July 19, 1945, in Las Villas, a province of Cuba, to Roberto Cisneros and Olga Lezcano. He and his family moved to Havana shortly after his birth. He studied in Cuba under the Piarist Fathers as a child. In October 1961, Octavio Cisneros immigrated to the United States as a political refugee as part of Operation Peter Pan. Relocated to Marquette, Michigan, he attended Negaunee St. Paul High School in Negaunee, Michigan.

Cisneros then studied at St. Lawrence Minor Seminary in Mount Calvary, Wisconsin, where he obtained an Associate of Arts degree, and at Niagara University in Lewiston, New York, earning a Bachelor of Arts degree. He studied theology at DeSales School of Theology in Washington, D.C., and at the Seminary of the Immaculate Conception in Huntington, New York, earning a Master of Divinity degree.

== Priesthood ==
Cisneros was ordained to the priesthood for the Diocese of Brooklyn by Bishop Francis Mugavero on May 29, 1971. For the first eight years of his priesthood, Cisneros served as parochial vicar at St. Michael's Parish in Sunset Park in Brooklyn. In 1979, Cisneros was named diocesan coordinator of the Hispanic Apostolate. Eight years later, he was appointed pastor of Our Lady of Sorrows Parish in the Corona section of Queens.

Cisneros' subsequent appointments were as an episcopal vicar in the Brooklyn East Vicariate and as rector of the Cathedral Seminary in the Douglaston section of Queens He was raised to the rank of honorary prelate of his holiness by Pope John Paul II in 1988. In 2004, Cisneros was named secretary for priestly formation in the diocesan chancery.

=== Auxiliary Bishop of Brooklyn ===
On June 6, 2006, Cisneros was appointed as an auxiliary bishop of the Diocese of Brooklyn and titular bishop of Eanach Dúin by Pope Benedict XVI. He received his episcopal consecration on August 22, 2006, from Bishop Nicholas DiMarzio, with Bishops Thomas Daily and Ignatius Catanello serving as co-consecrators.

Cisneros served as vice-postulator (or promoter) of the cause for canonization (Sainthood) of Félix Varela, a 19th-century Cuban priest. While auxiliary bishop, Cisneros also served as pastor of Holy Child Jesus Parish in the Richmond Hill section of Queens.

=== Retirement ===
On July 19, 2020, Cisneros reached the mandatory retirement age of 75 for bishops and submitted his letter of resignation to Pope Francis. On October 30, 2020, Pope Francis accepted Cisneros' resignation. Cisneros continues to serve as pastor of Holy Child Jesus, as well as vicar of Hispanic concerns for the diocese.

On January 20, 2022, Cisneros traveled to Chalatenango, El Salvador to celebrate a mass at the gravesites of Maryknoll Sisters Maura Clarke and Ita Ford. The two nuns from the Archdiocese of New York had been murdered in El Salvador on December 2, 1980, by soldiers of the El Salvador Army.

== See also ==
- Catholic Church hierarchy
- Catholic Church in the United States
- Historical list of the Catholic bishops of the United States
- List of Catholic bishops of the United States
- Lists of patriarchs, archbishops, and bishops

Catholic Church titles
Preceded by –	Auxiliary Bishop of Brooklyn; 2006–2020	Succeeded by –
Preceded by Michael Aidan Courtney	Titular Bishop of Eanach Dhúin; 2006–present	Succeeded by Incumbent
