= Witold Mroziewski =

Polish Catholic priest

The Most Reverend Witold Mroziewski
- Auxiliary Bishop of Brooklyn
- Church: Catholic
- Diocese: Brooklyn
- Appointed: May 19, 2015
- Other post: Titular Bishop of Walla Walla

Orders
- Ordination: June 29, 1991 by Juliusz Paetz
- Consecration: July 20, 2015 by Nicholas Anthony DiMarzio, William Murphy, Raymond Chappetto

Personal details
- Born: March 25, 1966 (age 60) Augustów, Poland
- Education: John Paul II Catholic University of Lublin
- Motto: Parare vias Domini (To prepare the ways of the Lord)

Styles of Witold Mroziewski
- Reference style: His Excellency; The Most Reverend
- Spoken style: Your Excellency
- Religious style: Bishop

Witold Mroziewski (born March 25, 1966) is a Polish-American prelate of the Catholic Church. He has been serving as an auxiliary bishop of the Diocese of Brooklyn in New York City since 2015.

== Biography ==
=== Early life ===
Witold Mroziewski was born on March 25, 1966, in Augustów, Poland, to Jan Edmund Mroziewski and Wacława Mroziewska née Jabłońska. He attended the John Paul II Catholic University of Lublin (KUL) in Lublin, Poland, where he earned his Master of Theology degree in 1991.

=== Priesthood ===
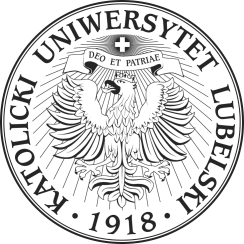
John Paul II Catholic University of Lublin (KUL), Lubin, Poland

Mroziewski was ordained a priest in Łomża, Poland, at the Łomża Cathedral for the Diocese of Łomża by Bishop Juliusz Paetz on June 29, 1991. The diocese then assigned him as parochial vicar at a parish in Kadzidlo, Poland.

The Diocese of Łomża sent Mroziewski to New York City in 1992 to minister to Polish citizens in the city. In 1993, the Diocese of Brooklyn assigned him as parochial vicar at Our Lady of Czestochowa-Saint Casimir Parish in Brooklyn. He became pastor of this parish in 2000. Mroziewski went back to KUL to earn a Master of Canon Law degree in 2001.

In 2001, Mroziewski was incardinated, or transferred, from the Diocese of Łomża to the Diocese of Brooklyn. He received a Ruris Canon Lawyer degree from KUL in 2003. He was moved from Our Lady in 2013 to Holy Cross Parish in Brooklyn to serve as pastor there.

=== Auxiliary Bishop of Brooklyn ===
Mroziewski was appointed titular bishop of Walla Walla and an auxiliary bishop of Brooklyn on May 19, 2015, by Pope Francis. He received his episcopal consecration at the Co-Cathedral of St. Joseph in Brooklyn by Bishop Nicholas DiMarzio on July 20, 2015, with Bishop William Murphy and Auxiliary Bishop Raymond Chappetto acting as co-consecrators.

== See also ==
- Catholic Church hierarchy
- Catholic Church in the United States
- Historical list of the Catholic bishops of the United States
- List of Catholic bishops of the United States
- Lists of patriarchs, archbishops, and bishops

== Episcopal succession ==
Catholic Church titles
Preceded by –	Auxiliary Bishop of Brooklyn; 2015–present	Succeeded by -
