= Diocese of Brooklyn =

Latin Catholic jurisdiction in New York, US

Coordinates: 40°41′49″N 73°59′11″W

Diocese of Brooklyn Diœcesis Bruklyniensis
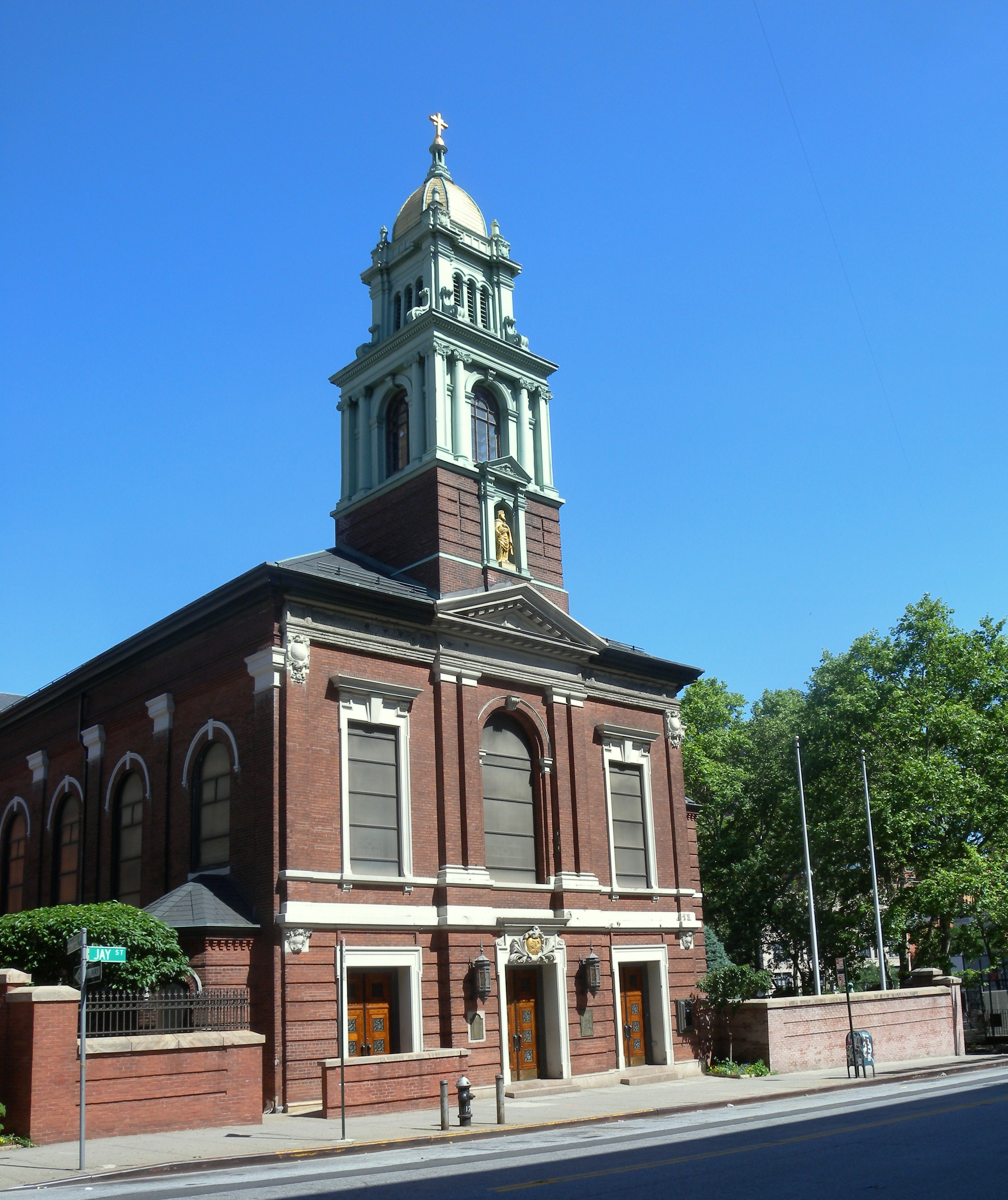
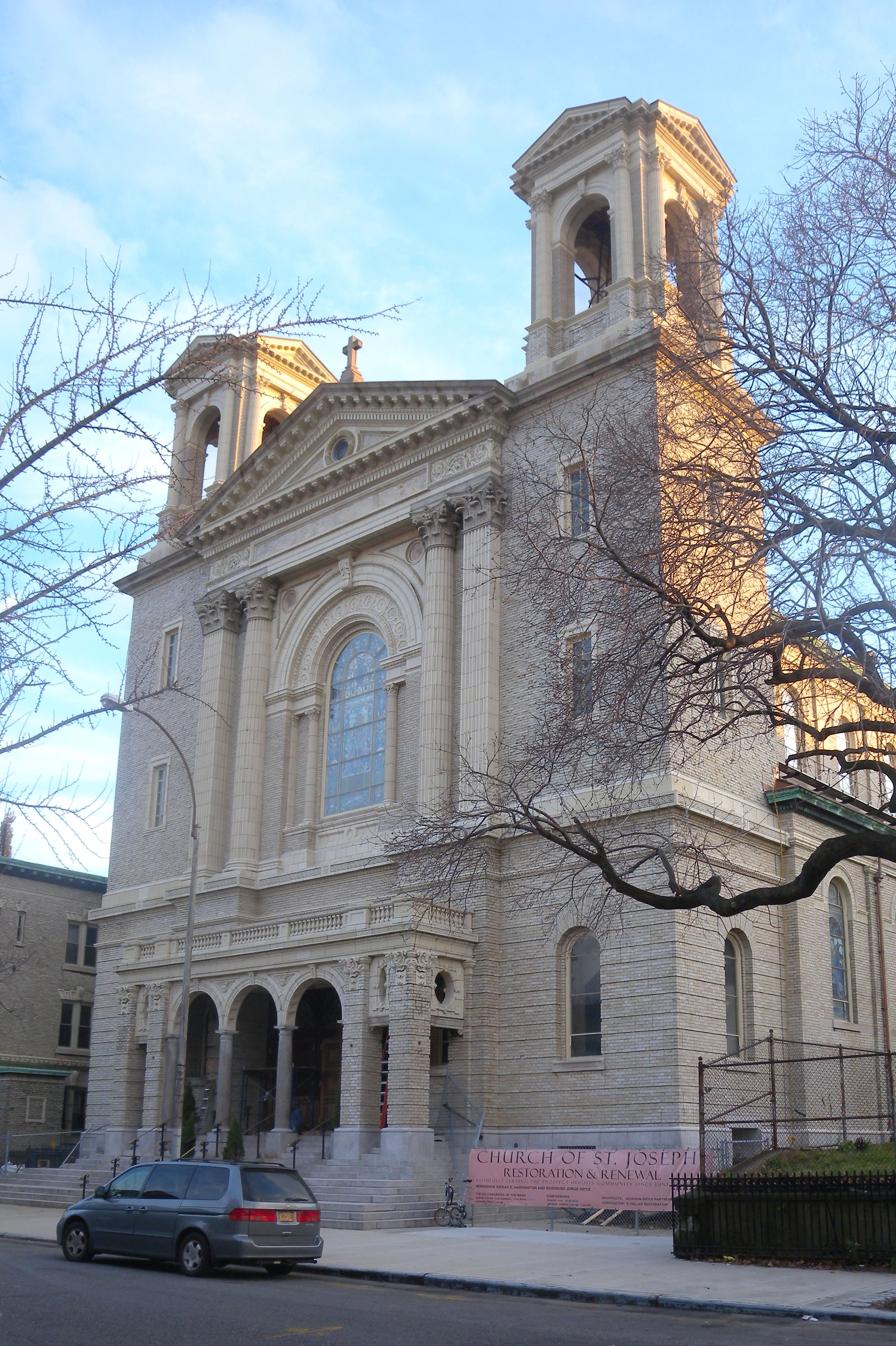
- Cathedral Basilica of St. James Co-Cathedral of St. Joseph

- Coat of arms

Location
- Country: United States
- Territory: Brooklyn and Queens
- Ecclesiastical province: Archdiocese of New York
- Headquarters: 310 Prospect Park West; Brooklyn, New York, 11215

Statistics
- Area: 179 sq mi (460 km^{2})
- Population: Total; Catholics: (as of July 2017); 5,007,353; 1,506,000 (30.1%)
- Parishes: 185
- Churches: 211
- Schools: 99

Information
- Denomination: Catholic
- Sui iuris church: Latin Church
- Rite: Roman Rite
- Established: July 29, 1853; 173 years ago
- Cathedral: Cathedral Basilica of St. James
- Co-cathedral: Co-Cathedral of St. Joseph
- Secular priests: 472

Current leadership
- Pope: Leo XIV
- Bishop: Robert J. Brennan
- Metropolitan Archbishop: Ronald Hicks
- Auxiliary Bishops: James Massa; Witold Mroziewski
- Vicar General: Joseph R. Grimaldi
- Judicial Vicar: Francis K. Asagba
- Bishops emeritus: Nicholas Anthony DiMarzio; Octavio Cisneros; Raymond Francis Chappetto; Paul Robert Sanchez; Neil Edward Tiedemann

Map
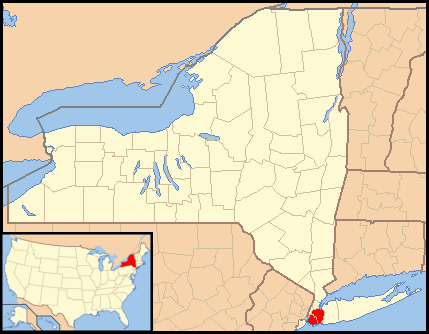

Website
- dioceseofbrooklyn.org

The Diocese of Brooklyn (Latin: Diœcesis Bruklyniensis) is a diocese of the Catholic Church in the state of New York. It is headquartered in Brooklyn and its territory encompasses the New York City boroughs of Brooklyn and Queens. Brooklyn is a suffragan diocese in the ecclesiastical province of the metropolitan Archdiocese of New York. The diocesan cathedral is the Cathedral Basilica of St. James in Downtown Brooklyn and its co-cathedral is the Co-Cathedral of St. Joseph in Prospect Heights. Brooklyn is one of the few dioceses in the United States that is made up of 100% urban territory. The bishop is Robert J. Brennan.

== History ==
=== 1784 to 1800 ===
In 1784, Pope Pius VI erected the Apostolic Prefecture of United States of America, creating a separate jurisdiction for the new United States from the Catholic Church of Great Britain. That same year, the new State of New York repealed the Colonial-era law prohibiting Catholic priests from residing in New York.

With the anti-priest law repealed, the French consul in New York City, Hector St. John de Crevecoeur, organized a group of laymen in 1785 to open St. Peter's Parish in Manhattan, the first Catholic parish in New York City. In 1800, the congregation opened a school at St. Peter's, the first Catholic school in New York.

In 1789, Pius VI raised the Apostolic Prefecture of United States to the Diocese of Baltimore, headed by the first American bishop, John Carroll. For the next nine years, Carroll was in charge of the Catholic Church in New York State along with the rest of the nation.

=== 1800 to 1853 ===
Catholic immigration to Brooklyn started with the opening of the Brooklyn Navy Yard in 1801. It attracted many Catholic immigrants from Northern Ireland to work there. Since there was no Catholic parish in Brooklyn, they would cross the East River to Manhattan on Sundays to attend mass at St. Peter's Church. Bishop John Power, the vicar apostolic of New York, would celebrate mass in Brooklyn in private homes.

In 1808, Pope Pius VII erected the Diocese of New York, with jurisdiction over the entire State of New York. By 1814, the diocese had four priests and two churches in New York City, both in Manhattan. The Catholic population of the diocese was approximately 15,000, primarily Irish with some English, French and Germans.

The first Catholic parish in the City of Brooklyn was St. James, founded in 1822. By 1826, the Diocese of New York had grown to 18 priests, 12 churches and a Catholic population of 150,000. The Sisters of Charity arrived in Brooklyn in 1834, becoming the first women's religious institute in that city.

=== 1853 to 1900 ===
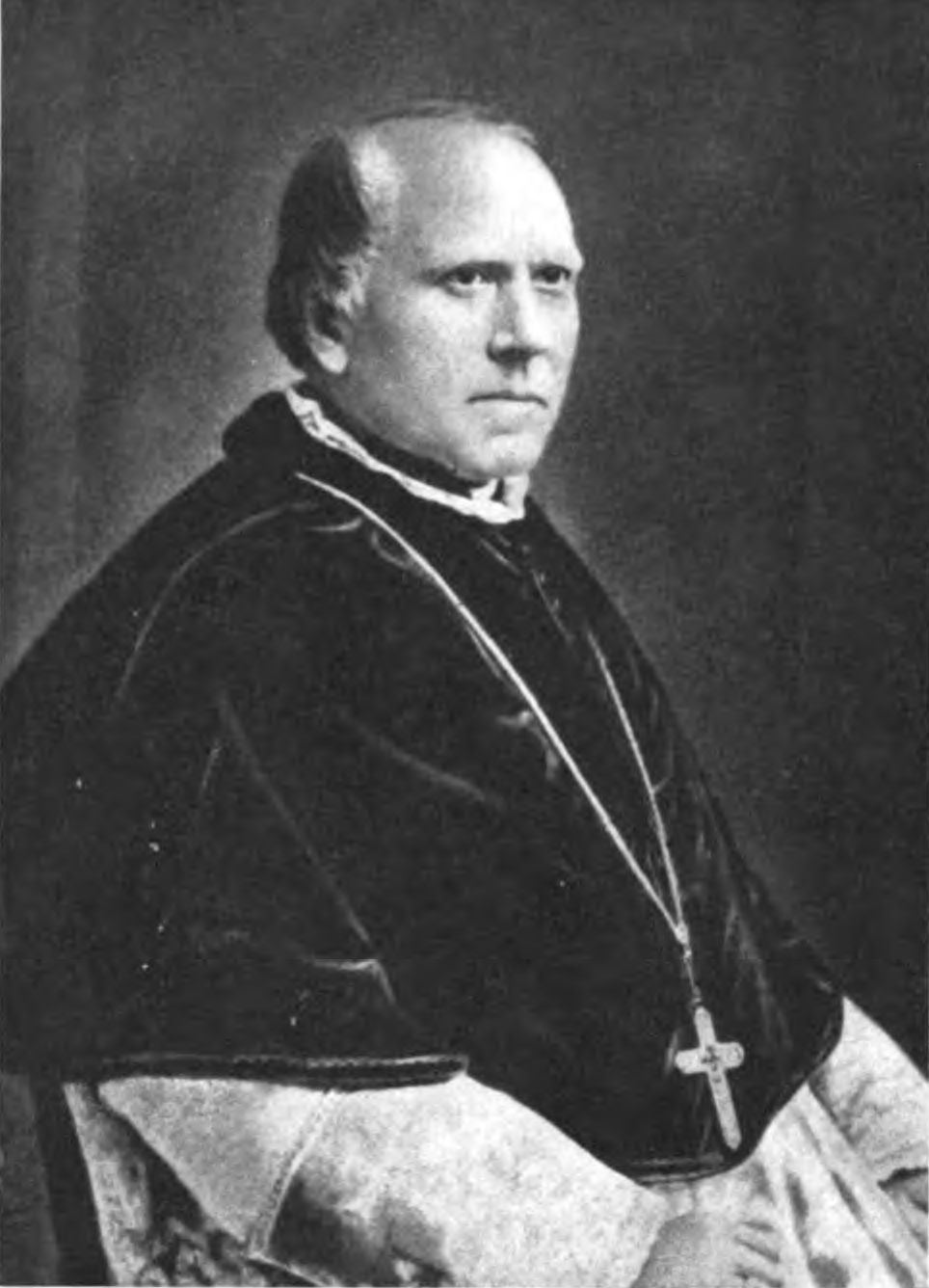
Bishop Loughlin (1914)

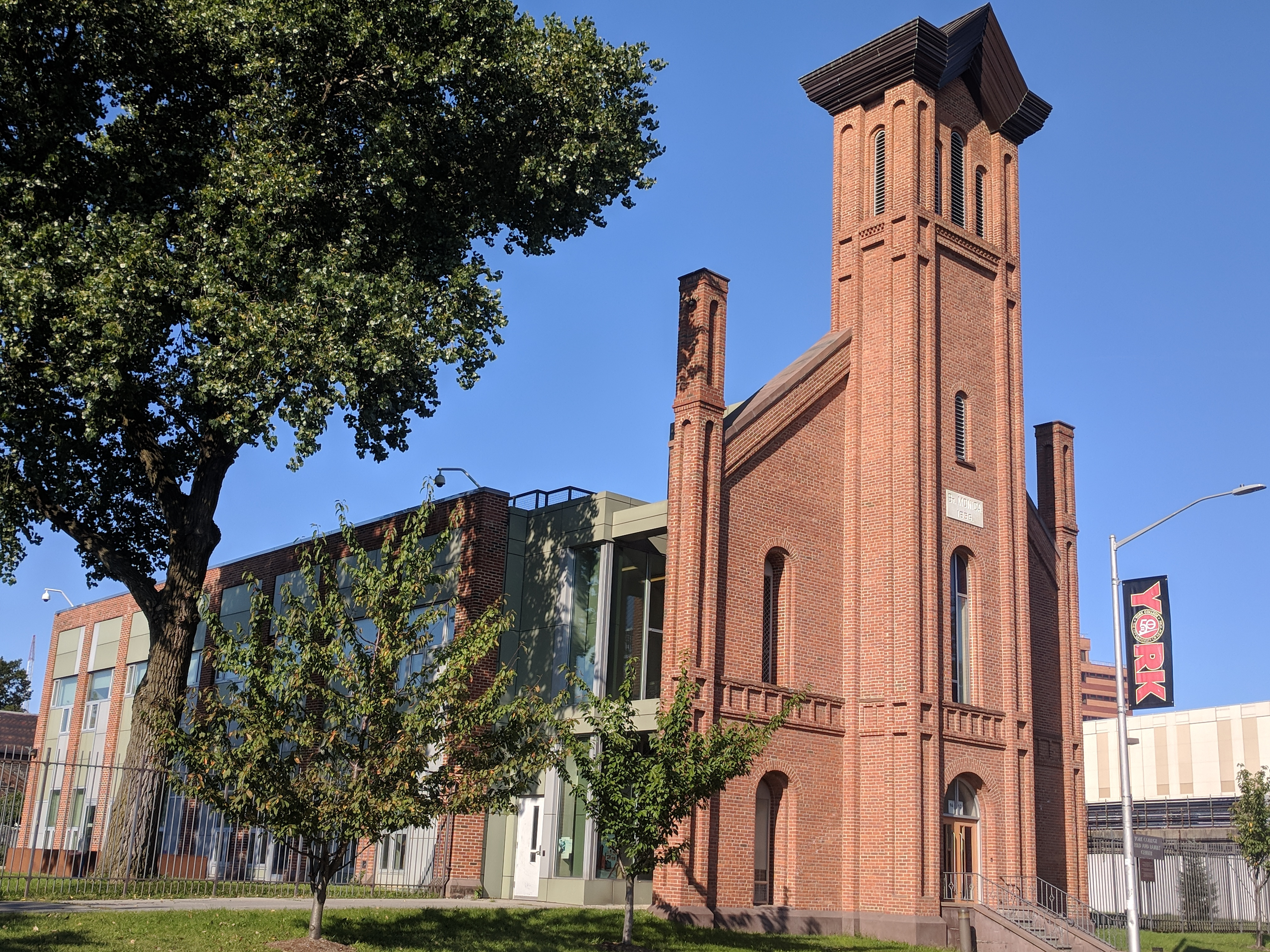
Former St. Monica Church, Queens, New York, founded in 1856 (2018)

Pope Pius IX erected the Diocese of Brooklyn in 1853 out of the Archdiocese of New York. The new diocese included the City of Brooklyn, Queens County and the two counties in Long Island. The pope named John Loughlin of New York as its first bishop. Loughlin chose St. James Church as his cathedral. The first Catholic church in Queens, St. Monica's, was dedicated in 1856. During his episcopate, Loughlin founded 120 parishes. He started construction of the new, larger Cathedral of the Immaculate Conception in 1868, but then stopped work on it to fund charities.

St. Francis Academy for boys was founded in 1858 in Brooklyn by a group of Franciscans from Ireland. It is today St. Francis College.

During Loughlin's 38-year tenure, the Catholic population of the diocese increased from about 15,000 to nearly 400,000. During this time, 125 churches and chapels, 93 parochial schools, two colleges, 10 orphanages, five hospitals, two homes for the elderly and a residence for homeless boys were built. He erected the Chapel of the Resurrection at Holy Cross Cemetery in 1855. Loughlin started construction of a new cathedral in 1868, but stopped the project so as to spend the funds on diocesan charities.

The Sisters of Charity opened St. Mary's Female Hospital in Brooklyn in 1868. That same year, the massive St. John’s Home for Boys opened in Brooklyn. The Congregation of Our Lady of Charity of the Good Shepherd opened the House of the Good Shepard, a reformatory and industrial school for "fallen women".

In 1870, Loughlin invited the Vincentian Order to establish a college for the increasing immigrant population. They opened St. John's College in Brooklyn, which is today St. John's University.

After Loughlin died in 1891, Pope Leo XIII appointed Monsignor Charles McDonnell of New York as the second bishop of Brooklyn. The diocese at that time included 250,000 Catholics. As more immigrants from different nationalities entered Brooklyn, McDonnell founded several national parishes that ministered to this immigrants in their native languages. He also built three hospitals.

=== 1900 to 1960 ===
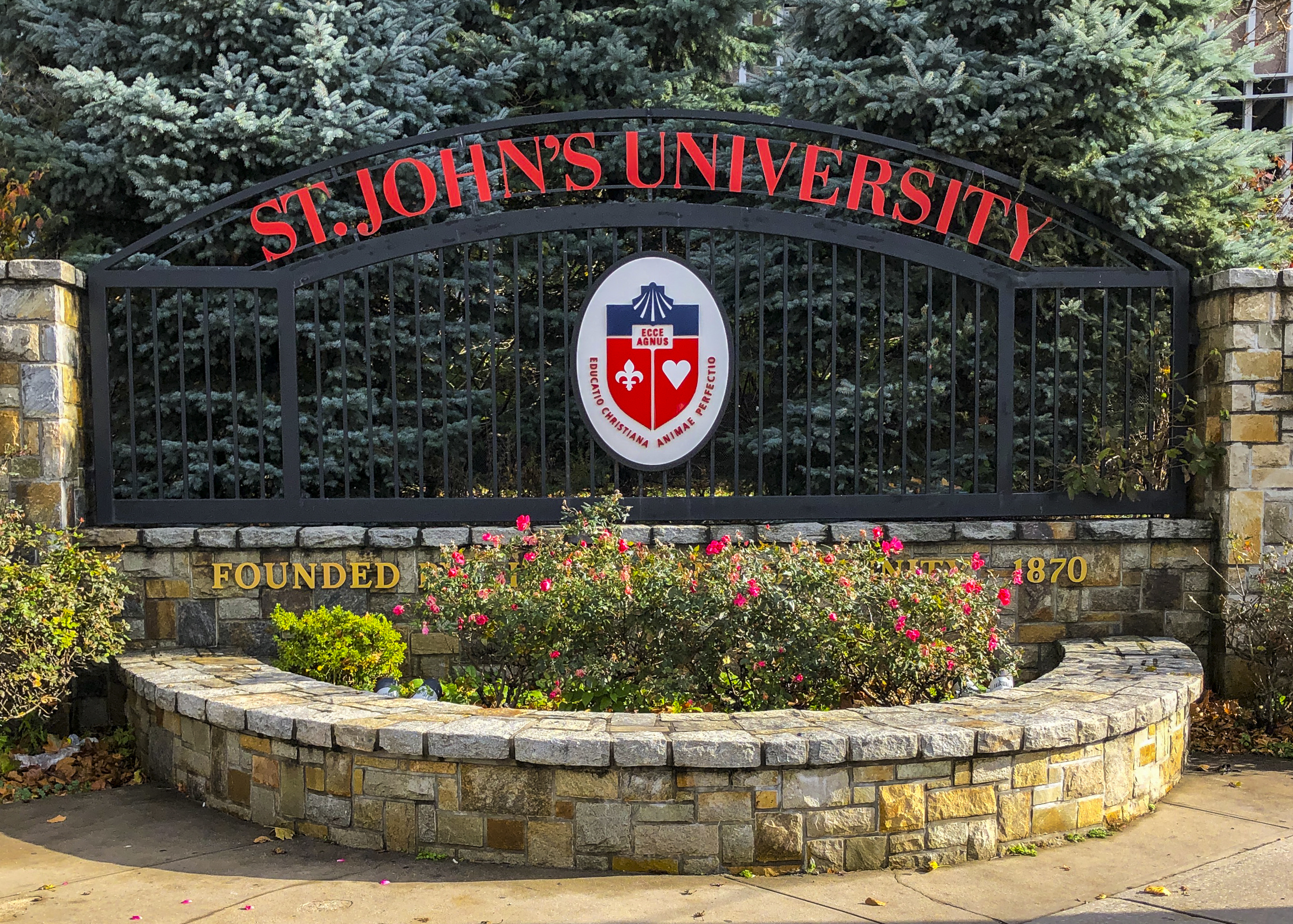
St. John's University, Queens, New York (2020)

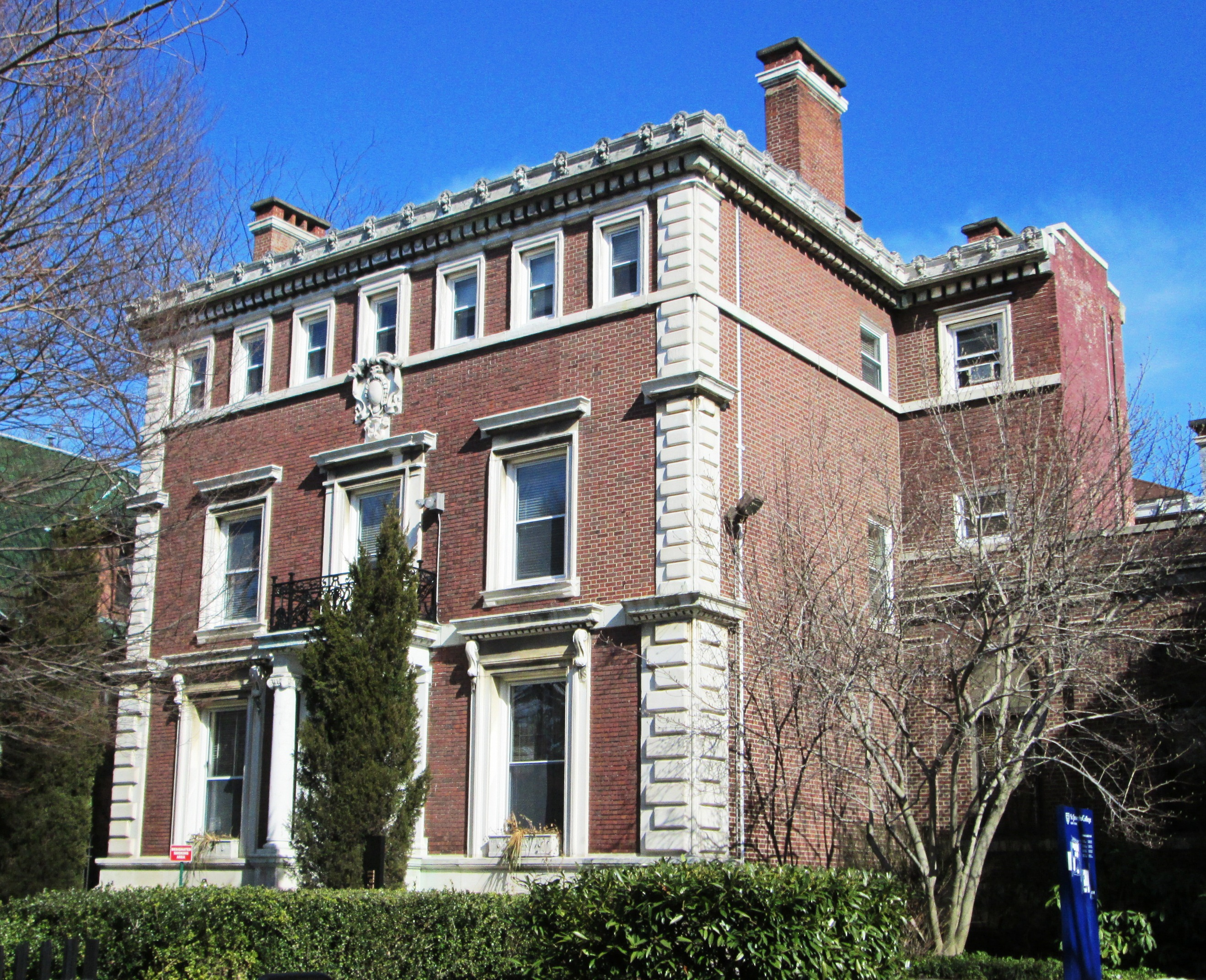
St. Joseph University, Brooklyn, New York (2013)

The St. Dominic Congregation of the Holy Cross opened the Mary Immaculate Hospital in the Jamaica section of Queens in 1902. McConnell in 1903 dedicated the Pro-Cathedral of St. James. It replaced the original St. James Cathedral, which had been severely damaged by fire.

In 1916, the Congregation of the Sisters of St. Joseph opened St. Joseph College for Women in the Clinton Hill neighborhood of Brooklyn. It is today St. Joseph's University.

Auxiliary Bishop Thomas Molloy of Brooklyn was named the third bishop of that diocese by Pope Benedict XV in 1921. During his 35-year tenure, the number of Catholics in the diocese exceeded one million, making it the most populous one in the country. During the Great Depression, Molloy established a labor school to teach working men the Catholic principles that apply to trade unionism. He also ordered the diocesan clergy to take courses in industrial issues to better instruct their parishioners. Molloy died in 1956.

Pope Pius XII split the Diocese of Rockville Centre from Brooklyn on April 6, 1957. Ten days later, the pope named Bishop Bryan McEntegart, rector of the Catholic University of America in Washington, D.C., as the next bishop of Brooklyn. During his tenure he launched a multimillion-dollar building program, which included six high schools, a hospital and a four-year theological seminary.

=== 1960 to 1990 ===
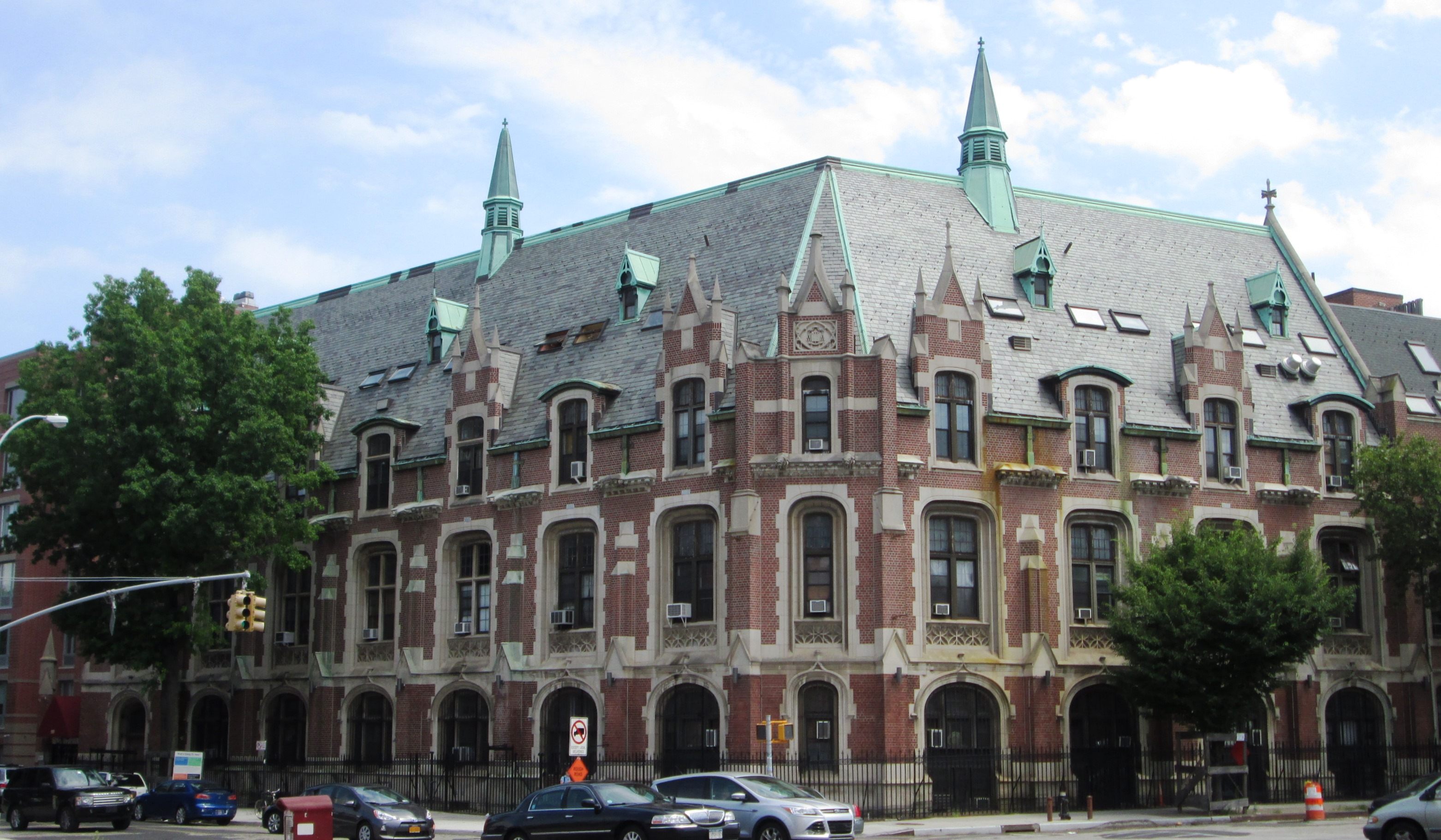
Immaculate Conception Center, Brooklyn, New York (2012)

In 1967, McEntegart restructured Cathedral College due to shrinking enrollment and fewer students becoming priests. The Brooklyn and Queens campuses became four-year seminary high schools. The college programs were transferred into an independent four-year college seminary in Douglaston in Queens. The college was established to serve seminarians from the Diocese of Brooklyn, the Diocese of Rockville Centre and the Archdiocese of New York. The college's inaugural class had 38 students, 22 of whom eventually became priests. By the early 1970s, the college had over 370 students and offered over a dozen college majors.

McEntegart promoted outreach to the growing Hispanic population, sending priests and religious sisters to study Spanish language and culture. McEntegart retired in 1968.

Pope Paul VI named Francis Mugavero as the first Italian-American bishop of Brooklyn in 1968. In 1971, Mugavero established the Catholic Migration Office to serve immigrants and refugees. He created the first apostolates in 1972 for the Italian, Haitian, Polish, Korean, Croatian, and Spanish communities. Mugavero often called Brooklyn "the diocese of immigrants," and was proud that Mass was celebrated there in 14 languages.

Mugavero announced the Nehemiah project, in association with East Brooklyn Churches, at a press conference in June 1982. The plan was to build houses in the Brownsville area of Brooklyn for lower income families. By 1985, the Nehemiah project had produced 300 new row houses.

In 1970, a woman from Bayside in Queens, Veronica Lueken, had stated that she was seeing apparitions of the Virgin Mary, Jesus, and numerous Catholic saints. Over the years, these apparitions became known as the "visions of Bayside". In 1986, Mugavero issued a declaration on Lueken's visions, stating that they "completely lacked authenticity."

Mugavero in 1972 renamed the Pro-Cathedral of St. James as the Cathedral of St. James. In 1987, Mugavero established the Immaculate Conception Center at the site of the former Cathedral College to house diocesan offices, ministries and a retreat center. The Vatican in 1982 designated the Cathedral of St. James as a minor basilica. Mugavero retired in 1990.

=== 1990 to 2020 ===
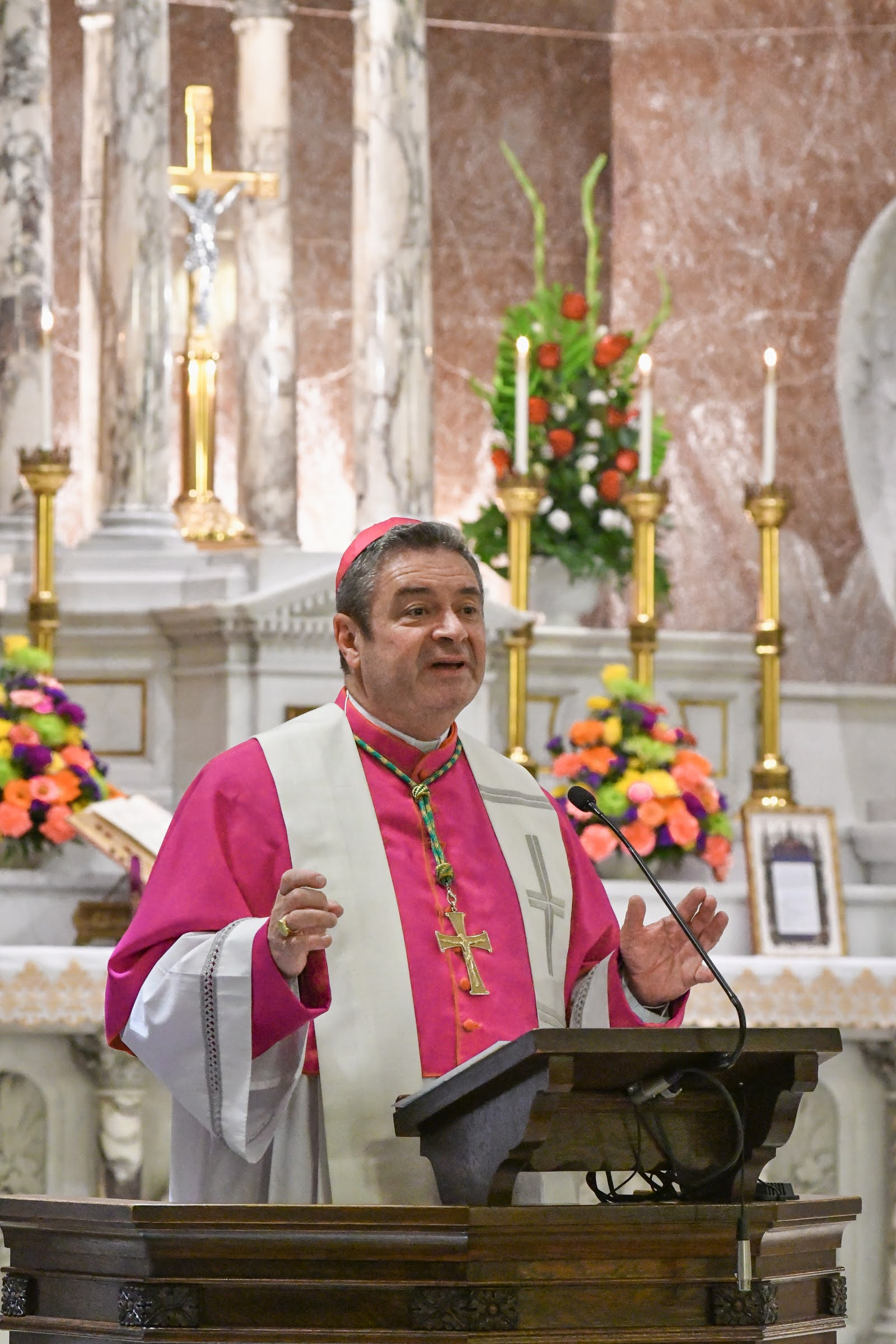
Bishop Brennan (2020)

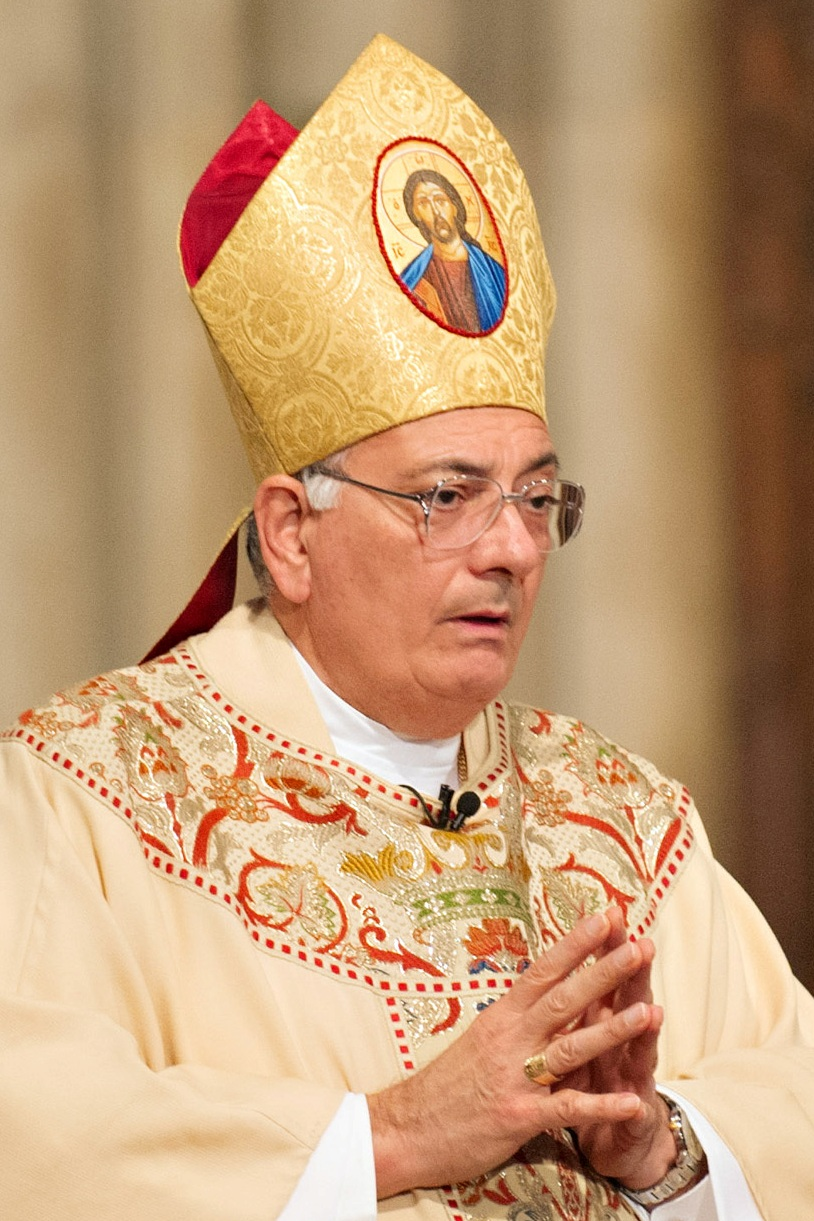
Bishop DiMarzio (2012)

To replace Mugavero, Pope John Paul II in 1990 appointed Bishop Thomas Daily from the Diocese of Palm Beach as the next bishop of Brooklyn. Shortly after his installation, he stated that New York Governor Mario Cuomo, would not be welcomed as a speaker in the diocese's parishes because of Cuomo's support of abortion legalization. Daily retired in 2003.

The next bishop of Brooklyn was Bishop Nicholas DiMarzio of the Diocese of Camden, appointed by John Paul II in 2003.

St. Joseph's Church in the Prospect Heights section of Brooklyn as designated as a co-cathedral in February 2013, by Pope Benedict XVI. DiMarzio had requested the designation due to the small seating capacity of the Cathedral Basilica of St. James. In September 2018, the diocese agreed to a $27.5 million settlement for four victims of sexual abuse by a lay educator. In February 2019, the diocese published a list of 108 clergy who were credibly accused of committing sexual abuse, some of whom have also been convicted for their crimes. Along with the list, Bishop DiMarzio also issued a letter of apology, asking for forgiveness.

=== 2020 to present ===
A burglar in May 2020 broke into St. Augustine Church in the Park Slope neighborhood of Brooklyn and stole a gold tabernacle valued at $2 million. The thief emptied the contents of the tabernacle on the altar and the floor.

Pope Francis named Bishop Robert J. Brennan from the Diocese of Columbus as bishop of Brooklyn in September 2021.

The diocese in November 2021 fired Matthew LaBanca from his two music jobs at St. Joseph Catholic Academy in Astoria and Corpus Christi Church in Woodside. He was terminated after entering a same-sex marriage in August of that year.

Brennan, in November 2023, expressed his shock at a music video for singer Sabrina Carpenter that was filmed inside Annunciation of the Blessed Virgin Mary Church in Brooklyn. Staged for the song "Feather", the video showed Carpenter dancing around the sanctuary with several items on top of the altar, while appearing with "no pants". Monsignor Jamie Gigantiello, the church pastor and vicar for development of the diocese, later apologized to the parish and was disciplined by Brennan.

== Parishes ==
As of 2025, the Diocese of Brooklyn operates 185 parishes and 211 churches to serve 1.5 million Catholic residents.

== Cemeteries ==
Catholic Cemeteries of the Diocese of Brooklyn operates four diocesan cemeteries:

- Holy Cross Cemetery in East Flatbush, Brooklyn
- St. John Cemetery in Middle Village, Queens
- Mount St. Mary Cemetery in Flushing, Queens
- St. Charles / Resurrection Cemeteries in East Farmingdale, Suffolk County

It also operates the following former parish cemeteries:

- Most Holy Trinity Cemetery in Bushwick, Brooklyn
- Our Lady of Mount Carmel Cemetery in Astoria, Queens
- St. Monica Cemetery in Jamaica, Queens
- St. Mary Star of the Sea Cemetery in Inwood, Nassau County
- Trinity Cemetery in Amityville, Suffolk County

Some cemeteries operated by the Diocese of Brooklyn are in Nassau or Suffolk Counties, even though these counties are part of the Diocese of Rockville Centre.

== Bishops ==
=== Bishops of Brooklyn ===
1. John Loughlin (1853 – 1891)
2. Charles Edward McDonnell (1892 – 1921)
3. Thomas Edmund Molloy (1922 – 1956), elevated to archbishop ad personam in 1951
4. Bryan Joseph McEntegart (1957 – 1968), elevated to archbishop ad personam in 1966
5. Francis Mugavero (1968 – 1990)
6. Thomas Vose Daily (1990 – 2003)
7. Nicholas Anthony DiMarzio (2003 – 2021)
8. Robert J. Brennan (2021 – present)

=== Current auxiliary bishops ===
- James Massa (2015 – present)
- Witold Mroziewski (2015 – present)

=== Former auxiliary bishops ===
- George Mundelein (1909 – 1915), appointed Archbishop of Chicago (cardinal in 1924)
- Thomas Edmund Molloy (1920 – 1922), appointed bishop of this diocese
- Raymond Augustine Kearney (1935 – 1956)
- John Joseph Boardman (1952 – 1977)
- Edmund Joseph Reilly (1955 – 1958)
- Joseph Peter Michael Denning (1959 – 1982)
- Charles Richard Mulrooney (1959 – 1981)
- John J. Snyder (1973 – 1979), appointed Bishop of Saint Augustine
- Joseph Michael Sullivan (1980 – 2005)
- René Arnold Valero (1980 – 2005)
- Anthony Bevilacqua (1980 – 1983), appointed Bishop of Pittsburgh and later Archbishop of Philadelphia (elevated to Cardinal in 1991)
- Ignatius Anthony Catanello (1994 – 2010)
- Gerald Barbarito (1994 – 2000), appointed Bishop of Palm Beach
- Guy Sansaricq (2006 – 2010)
- Frank Joseph Caggiano (2006 – 2013), appointed Bishop of Bridgeport
- Octavio Cisneros (2006 – 2020), retired on October 30, 2020.
- Raymond Francis Chappetto (2012 – 2022), retired on March 7, 2022.
- Paul Robert Sanchez (2012 – 2022), retired on March 30, 2022.
- Neil Edward Tiedemann (2016 – 2023), retired on June 30, 2023.

=== Other diocesan priests who became bishops ===
- George J. Caruana, appointed Bishop of Puerto Rico in 1921 and later apostolic nuncio, apostolic delegate and titular archbishop
- James Henry Ambrose Griffiths, appointed Auxiliary Bishop of Military, USA in 1949 and later Auxiliary Bishop of New York
- John Joseph Carberry, appointed Coadjutor Bishop (in 1956) and later Bishop of Lafayette in Indiana, Bishop of Columbus, and Archbishop of Saint Louis (elevated to cardinal in 1969)
- Vincent John Baldwin appointed Auxiliary Bishop of Rockville Centre in 1962
- John R. McGann appointed Auxiliary Bishop of Rockville Centre in 1970 and later Bishop of Rockville Centre
- James Joseph Daly appointed Auxiliary Bishop of Rockville Centre in 1977
- Gerald Augustine John Ryan appointed Auxiliary Bishop of Rockville Centre in 1977
- Alfred John Markiewicz appointed Auxiliary Bishop of Rockville Centre in 1986 and later Bishop of Kalamazoo
- Emil Aloysius Wcela appointed Auxiliary Bishop of Rockville Centre in 1989
- Vincent DePaul Breen, appointed Bishop of Metuchen in 1997
- Edward Bernard Scharfenberger, appointed Bishop of Albany in 2014
- Kevin J. Sweeney, appointed Bishop of Paterson in 2020
- Manuel de Jesús Rodríguez, appointed Bishop of Palm Beach in 2025

=== Priests "equivalent to diocesan bishops" affiliated with this diocese ===
- Leo Joseph White, Apostolic Prefect of Garissa, Kenya, 1976-1984 – incardinated in 1990.

== Education ==
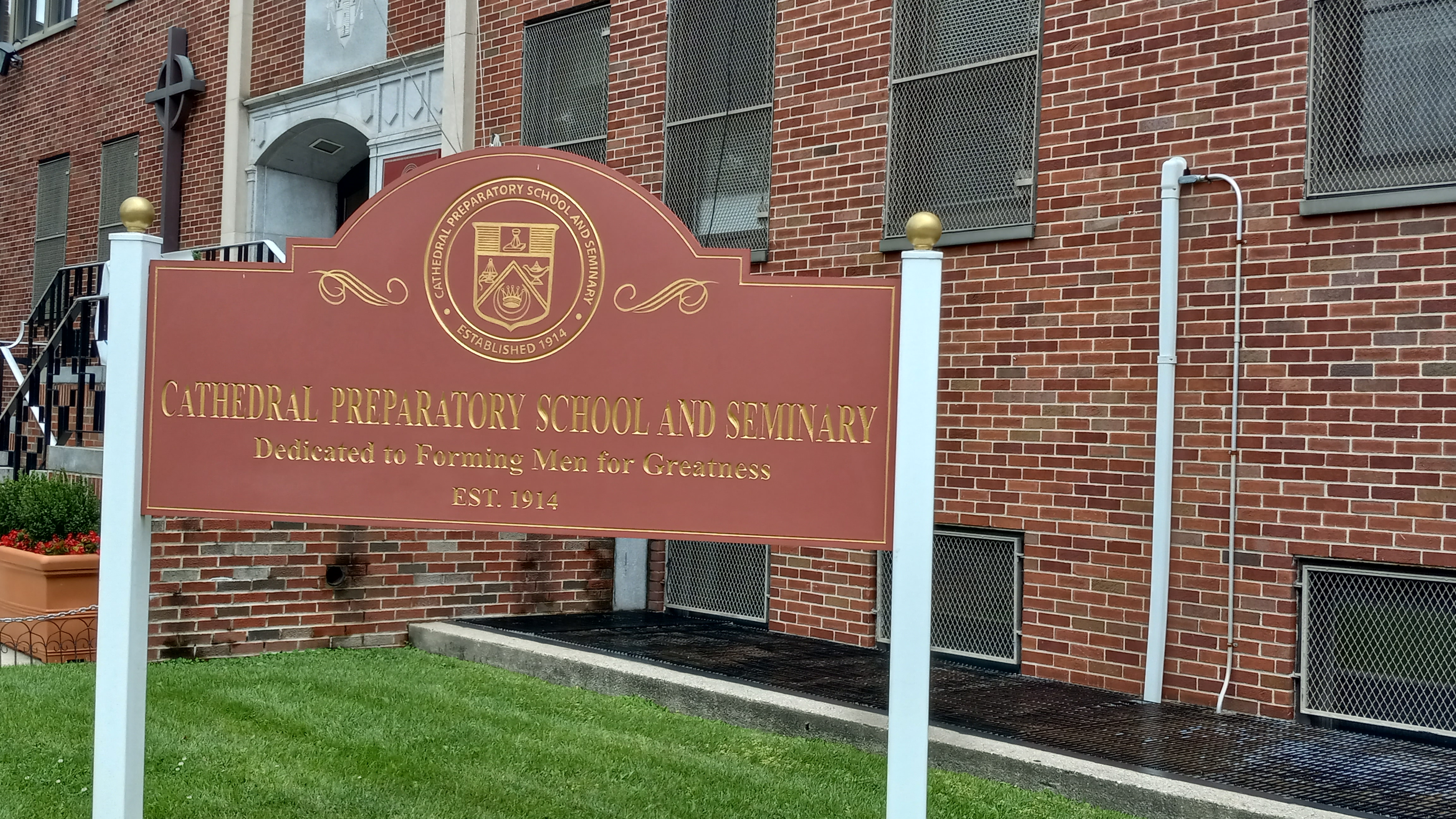
Cathedral Preparatory High School and Seminary, Brooklyn, New York (2017)

The Catholic Schools of Brooklyn and Queens operates the schools for the Diocese of Brooklyn. As of 2025, it runs 15 high schools. The total student population in 2025 was approximately 30,000. During the early 2000s, the diocese closed 45 schools.

The diocese operates the Cathedral Preparatory High School and Seminary in Queens. It is the only high school in the United States that prepares students for the priesthood.
