= Bryan Joseph McEntegart =

American prelate

His Excellency, The Most Reverend Bryan Joseph McEntegart
- Archbishop (personal title); Bishop of Brooklyn
- Church: Roman Catholic Church
- See: Diocese of Brooklyn
- Appointed: June 15, 1943
- Installed: 1943
- Term ended: 1953
- Predecessor: Thomas Edmund Molloy
- Successor: Francis Mugavero
- Previous posts: Bishop of Ogdensburg (1943 to 1953); Rector, Catholic University of America (1953 to 1957)

Orders
- Ordination: September 8, 1917 by John Murphy Farley
- Consecration: August 3, 1944 by Amleto Giovanni Cicognani

Personal details
- Born: January 5, 1893 Brooklyn, New York, U.S.
- Died: September 30, 1968 (aged 75) Brooklyn
- Denomination: Roman Catholic Church
- Parents: Patrick and Katherine (née Roe) McEntegart
- Profession: Director of Children's Division, Catholic Charities of New York
- Education: Manhattan College; St. Joseph's Seminary; Catholic University of America
- Motto: Estote factores verbi (Be doers of the word)
- Coat of arms

Bryan Joseph McEntegart (January 5, 1893 – September 30, 1968) was an American prelate of the Roman Catholic Church. He served as bishop of the Diocese of Ogdensburg in New York State (1943–1953), rector of the Catholic University of America (CUA) in Washington, D.C. (1953–1957), and as bishop of the Diocese of Brooklyn in New York City (1957–1968).

== Biography ==
=== Early life ===
Bryan McEntegart was born on January 5, 1893, in Brooklyn, New York, to Patrick and Katherine (née Roe) McEntegart. He studied at Manhattan College in New York City, obtaining a Bachelor of Arts degree in 1913. McEntegart then entered St. Joseph's Seminary in Yonkers, New York.

=== Priesthood ===
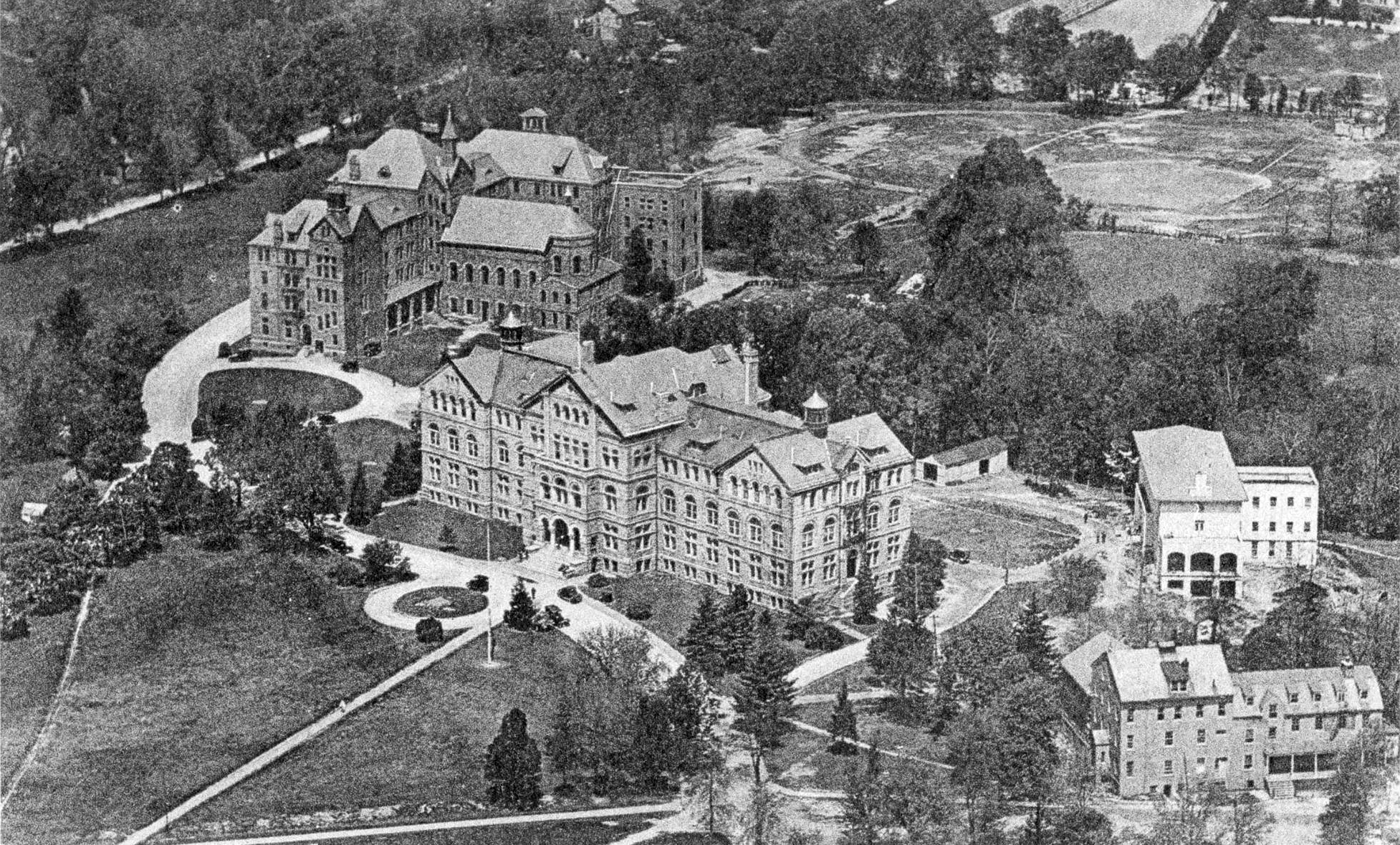
Catholic University of America, Washington, D.C. (1917)

McEntegart was ordained to the priesthood for the Archdiocese of New York by Cardinal John Farley in New York City on September 8, 1917. In 1918, he earned a Master's degree from CUA with a thesis entitled: "The Care of the Poor in New York in the 17th Century." After returning to New York, the archdiocese assigned McEntegart as a curate at Sacred Heart Parish in Manhattan. During this period, McEntegart pursued graduate studies at the New York School of Social Work. McEntegart was named the first director of the Children's Division in the Catholic Charities of the Archdiocese of New York. During his tenure as director, he taught courses in child welfare at Fordham Graduate School of Social Service. McEntegart was transferred in 1923 from Sacred Heart parish to the St. Patrick's Cathedral Parish.

During the American presidency of Herbert Hoover, McEntegart served on the White House Committee on Child Welfare. He was named director of the Child Welfare League of America in 1931. After the 1932 presidential election, US President Franklin D. Roosevelt retained McEntegart on the Child Welfare committee.

In addition to his other responsibilities, the archdiocese in 1938 named McEntegart as curate at St. Francis de Sales Parish in Manhattan. In 1941, he was elected president of the National Conference of Catholic Charities. From 1941 to 1943, McEntegart served as national secretary of the Catholic Near East Welfare Association. He became the first executive director of Catholic Relief Services in 1943. He also served on the board of the United Service Organizations for fourteen years.

=== Bishop of Ogdensburg ===
On June 5, 1943, McEntegart was appointed the fifth bishop of Ogdensburg by Pope Pius XII. He received his episcopal consecration on August 3, 1943, from Archbishop Amleto Cicognani, with Bishops Edmund Gibbons and Stephen Joseph Donahue serving as co-consecrators, at St. Patrick's Cathedral in Manhattan. Shortly after his installation, the Cathedral of Ogdensburg was destroyed by fire; however, McEntegart constructed a new edifice within months.

=== Rector of Catholic University of America ===
From 1953 to 1957, McEntegart served as CUA rector. The Vatican assigned him the titular see of Aradi on August 19, 1953. During his administration, he embarked on a large fund-raising campaign to expand all phases of the university's work.

=== Bishop of Brooklyn ===
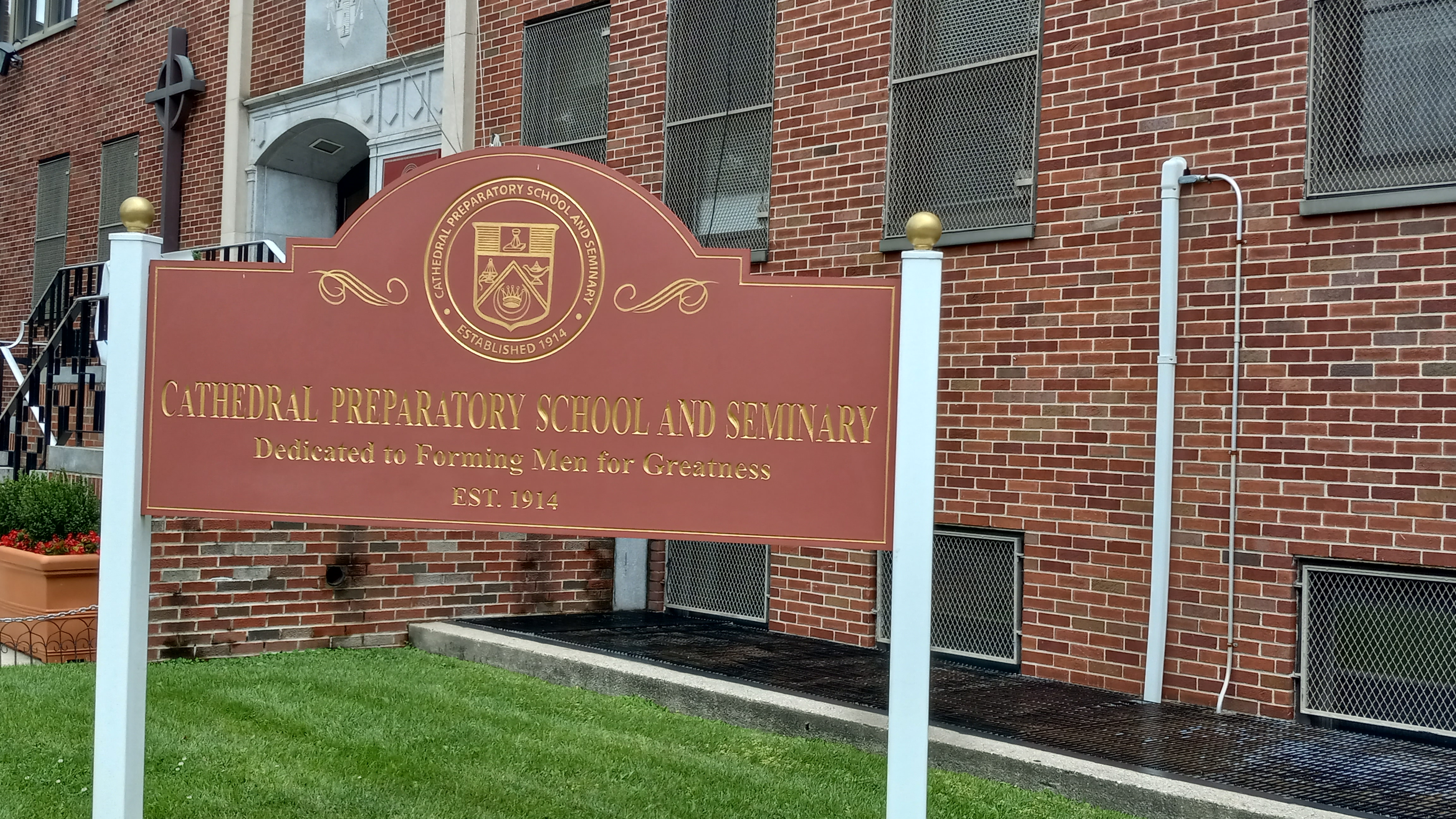
Cathedral Preparatory School and Seminary, New York City (2024)

Pope Pius XII appointed McEntegart as the fourth bishop of Brooklyn on April 16, 1957, the largest diocese in the United States in terms of Catholic population. He was installed by Cardinal Francis Spellman on June 13, 1957. During his tenure in Brooklyn, McEntegart launched a multimillion-dollar building program, which included six high schools, the Cathedral Preparatory Seminary in Queens, New York, a hospital, a college for training priests, and a four-year theological seminary.

McEntegart promoted outreach by the diocese to the growing Hispanic population in Brooklyn, sending priests and religious to study Spanish language and culture. He attended all four sessions of the Second Vatican Council Rome between 1962 and 1965; he implemented the reforms of the council, becoming a pioneer in the ecumenical movement and establishing the Pastoral Institute in Brooklyn in 1967. He was given the personal title of archbishop by Pope Paul VI on April 15, 1966.

=== Retirement ===
In early 1968, McEntegart tendered his resignation as bishop of Brooklyn because of poor health, and Pope Paul VI accepted it on July 17, 1968. Two months later, after suffering a stroke, Bryan McEntegart died on September 30, 1968 at his residence in the Fort Greene section of Brooklyn at age 75.

Catholic Church titles
Preceded by Francis Joseph Monaghan	Bishop of Ogdensburg; 1943–1953	Succeeded by Walter P. Kellenberg
Preceded by Thomas Edmund Molloy	Bishop of Brooklyn; 1957–1968	Succeeded by Francis Mugavero
Academic offices
Preceded by Patrick J. McCormick	Rector of CUA; 1953–1957	Succeeded by William J. McDonald
