= Raymond Augustine Kearney =

American prelate

Styles of Raymond Augustine Kearney
- Reference style: The Most Reverend
- Spoken style: Your Excellency
- Religious style: Monsignor

Raymond Augustine Kearney (September 25, 1902 – October 1, 1956) was an American prelate of the Roman Catholic Church. He served as an auxiliary bishop of the Diocese of Brooklyn from 1935 until his death in 1956.

== Biography ==
Raymond Kearney was born in Jersey City, New Jersey, one of seven children of Joseph Peter and Nora Isabelle (née Burke) Kearney. He and his family moved to Brooklyn, New York, while he was still an infant. He received his early education at the parochial school of the Church of the Nativity, where he served as an altar boy.

Kearney attended Brooklyn Preparatory School before studying at the College of the Holy Cross in Worcester, Massachusetts, where he earned a Bachelor of Arts degree in 1923. He studied for the priesthood in Rome at the Pontifical North American College and the Propaganda University, receiving a doctorate in theology in 1927.

Kearney was ordained a priest at the Basilica of St. John Lateran on March 12, 1927. Following his return to Brooklyn, he was assigned as a curate at Queen of All Saints Church, where he remained for two months. He then served at Holy Innocents Church for two years before engaging in diocesan work. In 1929, he earned a doctorate in canon law from the Catholic University of America in Washington, D.C. He served as chancellor of the Diocese of Brooklyn from 1930 to 1934. He was named a papal chamberlain in August 1933.

On December 22, 1934, Kearney was appointed auxiliary bishop of Brooklyn and titular bishop of Lysinia by Pope Pius XI. He received his episcopal consecration on February 25, 1935 from Archbishop Thomas Edmund Molloy, with Bishops Moses E. Kiley and Stephen Joseph Donahue serving as co-consecrators, at Our Lady of Perpetual Help Church. At age 32, he was the youngest Catholic bishop in the world and the first born in the twentieth century. In 1950, he was elected chairman of the Bishops' Committee on Motion Pictures, which supervised the work of the Legion of Decency. He was also recognized as an authority on canon law.

Kearney died from a heart attack at age 54.

Catholic Church titles
Preceded by –	Auxiliary Bishop of Brooklyn; 1935 – 1956	Succeeded by –
