= Nicholas Anthony DiMarzio =

American prelate

His Excellency, The Most Reverend Nicholas Anthony DiMarzio
- Bishop Emeritus of Brooklyn
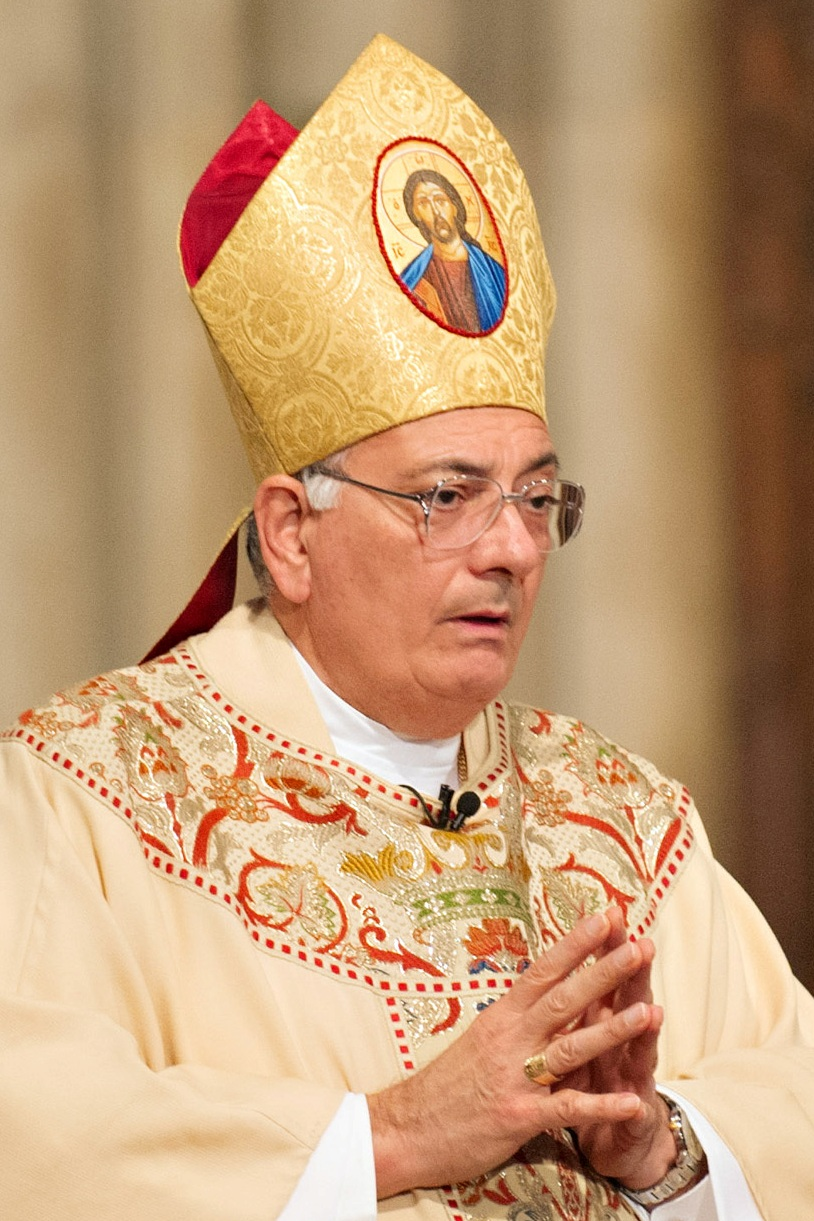
- DiMarzio in 2012
- Diocese: Brooklyn
- Appointed: August 1, 2003
- Installed: October 3, 2003
- Retired: November 30, 2021
- Predecessor: Thomas Vose Daily
- Successor: Robert J. Brennan
- Previous posts: Bishop of Camden (1999–2003); Auxiliary Bishop of Newark and Titular Bishop of Mauriana (1996–1999)

Orders
- Ordination: May 30, 1970 by Thomas Aloysius Boland
- Consecration: October 31, 1996 by Theodore Edgar McCarrick, Peter Leo Gerety, John M. Smith

Personal details
- Born: June 16, 1944 (age 82) Newark, New Jersey, US
- Denomination: Roman Catholic Church
- Education: Seton Hall University; The Catholic University of America
- Motto: Behold your mother

Ordination history
History
Diaconal ordination
- Ordained by
Priestly ordination
- Ordained by: Thomas Boland
Episcopal consecration
- Consecrated by: Theodore Edgar McCarrick
Episcopal succession
Bishops consecrated by Nicholas Anthony DiMarzio as principal consecrator
- Frank Joseph Caggiano: August 22, 2006
- Octavio Cisneros: August 22, 2006
- Guy Sansaricq: August 22, 2006
- Raymond Francis Chappetto: July 11, 2012
- Paul Robert Sanchez: July 11, 2012
- James Massa: July 20, 2015
- Witold Mroziewski: July 20, 2015
- Reference style: His Excellency; The Most Reverend
- Spoken style: Your Excellency
- Religious style: Bishop

Styles

Nicholas Anthony DiMarzio (born June 16, 1944) is an American prelate of the Roman Catholic Church who served as bishop of the Diocese of Brooklyn in New York City from 2003 to 2021.

DiMarzio previously served as bishop of the Diocese of Camden in New Jersey from 1999 to 2003 and as an auxiliary bishop of the Archdiocese of Newark in New Jersey from 1996 to 1999.

== Biography ==
=== Early life ===
Nicholas DiMarzio was born on June 16, 1944, in Newark, New Jersey, to Nicholas Sr. and Grace (née Grande) DiMarzio. He is the oldest of three children. His father served in the US Armed Forces, but later worked as a health inspector for the city of Newark. All of Nicholas DiMarzio's grandparents emigrated to the United States from Southern Italy.

DiMarzio grew up across the street from Cathedral Basilica of the Sacred Heart in Newark and attended the cathedral's grammar school. He graduated from St. Benedict's Preparatory School in Newark in 1962.

DiMarzio attended Immaculate Conception Seminary School in Darlington, New Jersey. He graduated with a bachelor's degree from Seton Hall University in South Orange, New Jersey, in 1966. In 1969, DiMarzio worked as a deacon at Our Lady of Mount Carmel Parish in Newark. He received a Bachelor of Sacred Theology degree in 1970 from The Catholic University of America in Washington, D.C. DiMarzio is a certified social worker and is fluent in Italian and Spanish and proficient in French.

=== Ordination and ministry ===
On May 30, 1970, DiMarzio was ordained to the priesthood for the Archdiocese of Newark by Archbishop Thomas Boland. After his ordination, the archdiocese assigned DiMarzio as an associate pastor at St. Nicholas Parish in Jersey City, New Jersey.

In 1976, DiMarzio was appointed as the refugee resettlement director for the archdiocese. He also created the Catholic Legal Immigration Network (CLINIC), serving as chairman for six years. During this time, DiMarzio also served a two-year term as director of the Office of Migration of Newark's Catholic Community Services, now Catholic Charities. DiMarzio would hold these positions while also serving pastoral roles in several parishes.

In 1977, DiMarzio was assigned as associate pastor at Holy Rosary Parish in Jersey City, New Jersey. In 1978, he was appointed administrator and pastor of St. Boniface Parish in Jersey City. DiMarzio. He was awarded a Master of Social Work degree from Fordham University in New York City in 1980.

In 1980, DiMarzio was appointed as chaplain of Holy Rosary Academy in Union City, New Jersey. He was transferred back to Holy Rosary Parish in 1984 to serve as its pastor. In 1985, DiMarzio became associate pastor at Our Lady of Mount Carmel Parish in Newark.

DiMarzio received a doctorate in social work research and policy from Rutgers University in New Jersey in 1985. That same year, he was appointed executive director for Migration and Refugee Services for the United States Conference of Catholic Bishops (USCCB) in Washington, D.C., serving there for six years. In 1986, DiMarzio was named a prelate of honor, with the title of monsignor, by Pope John Paul II.

In 1991, Archbishop Theodore McCarrick appointed DiMarzio as associate executive director of Catholic Community Services in Newark. In 1992, DiMarzio advanced to executive director, a position he held for five years. He also held the title of vicar for human services and vice president of the board of Cathedral Healthcare System.

=== Auxiliary Bishop of Newark ===
On September 6, 1996, John Paul II appointed DiMarzio as an auxiliary bishop of Newark and titular bishop of Mauriana. He was installed by McCarrick at the Cathedral Basilica of the Sacred Heart in Newark. While auxiliary bishop, DiMarzio also served as pastor at Our Lady of Mount Carmel Parish. From 1998 until 2001, he chaired the Migration Committee of the USCCB. In 2000, DiMarzio was appointed a member of the Pontifical Council for the Pastoral Care of Migrants and Itinerant People.

=== Bishop of Camden ===
On Jun 7, 1999, John Paul II appointed DiMarzio as the sixth bishop of Camden. He was installed at St. Agnes Church in Blackwood, New Jersey, on July 22, 1999.

While bishop, he established an Office of Ethnic Ministries, an Office of Black Catholic Ministry, and an Office of Hispanic Ministry. DiMarzio also created an apostolate to the Haitian community and founded two missions to serve the Korean and Vietnamese communities. In 2000, DiMarzio established Mater Ecclesiae Chapel, the first canonically established mission owned by a diocese and staffed exclusively by diocesan priests to offer exclusively the Tridentine Mass.

On March 23, 2003, DiMarzio approved an $880,000 settlement to 19 plaintiffs who had sued the diocese in 1994. The plaintiffs alleged sexual abuse by clergy in the diocese from 1961 through 1985. Seven of the plaintiff complaints had been dismissed in court over the years due to lack of evidence.

=== Bishop of Brooklyn ===
On August 1, 2003, John Paul II appointed DiMarzio as bishop of Brooklyn. He was installed at the Basilica of Our Lady of Perpetual Help in Brooklyn on October 3, 2003. That same month, DiMarzio spoke at the Immigrant Workers Freedom Ride Rally at Flushing Meadows Park in Queens. In November 2003 he addressed members of the Brooklyn Muslim community at a Ramadan celebration. He also attended in 2003 the Fifth World Congress of the Pontifical Council for the Pastoral Care of Migrants and Itinerant People in Rome.

In 2003, DiMarzio joined the Global Commission on International Migration, sponsored by the United Nations. He was the only American on the 19-member commission. In 2005, the commission published a report, entitled "Migration in an interconnected world; New directions for action". .

DiMarzio issued three pastoral letters as bishop of Brooklyn.

- "The New Evangelization in Brooklyn and Queens", October 2004.
- "The Family: The Hope of the New Evangelization", October 2005
- "Do Not Be Afraid - A Pastoral Vision for the New Evangelization", October 2007

From 2004 to 2007, DiMarzio chaired the Domestic Policy Committee of the USCCB. During his tenure, the committee formulated "Forming Consciences for Faithful Citizenship". It was published in 2008. He also served as chairman of the Bishops' Migration Committee, and was a member of the board of directors of Catholic Relief Services and chair of its finance committee, and a member of the Bishops' Task Force on Catholic Bishops and Politicians.

In 2009, DiMarzio published a presentation entitled "From Shadow To Light And From Scandal To Healing: The Experience of the Diocese of Brooklyn with the Sex Abuse Scandal". The presentation discussed actions taken by the diocese to protect youth and young adults from abuse. It discussed investigating, reporting, responsibility of the church, the Charter for the Protection of Children and Young People, accountability and reconciliation, prevention, victim assistance, the Safe Environment Office, effect on the laity, and youth in the Church. It also established a hotline for anyone reporting suspected abuse.

DiMarzio's newspaper column, entitled "Put Out Into the Deep", appeared weekly in the diocesan newspaper, The Tablet. He also appeared weekly on Currents in a segment titled "Into the Deep", where he discussed diocesan, local, national and international news.

=== Retirement ===
On June 16, 2019, DiMarzio submitted his letter of resignation as bishop of Brooklyn to Pope Francis upon reaching the age of 75, as required by canon law. On September 29, 2021, the Vatican announced that DiMarzio's resignation had been accepted. The pope appointed Bishop Robert J. Brennan as DiMarzio's successor.

=== Apostolic visitation ===
In October 2019, Francis appointed DiMarzio to lead an apostolic visitation to the Diocese of Buffalo. Bishop Richard Malone of Buffalo had been accused of mishandling sexual abuse allegations in his diocese. DiMarzio visited the diocese three times, interviewing over 80 officials, clergy and laypeople. He submitted a report to the Vatican in November 2019. While denying his departure had any connection to the visitation, Malone resigned as bishop of Buffalo in December 2019.

=== Abuse allegations ===
In November 2019, Mark Matzek, a New Jersey resident, alleged that DiMarzio and another priest had repeatedly molested him while he was an altar boy at St. Nicholas Parish and a student at St. Nicholas School in Jersey City in the mid-1970s. DiMarzio was a parish priest in the parish during that time. In March 2021, Matzek filed a lawsuit against DiMarzio and the diocese. In response to the allegation, DiMarzio made this statement in 2020:

In my nearly 50-year ministry as a priest, I have never engaged in unlawful or inappropriate behavior and I emphatically deny this allegation. I am confident I will be fully vindicated.

In June 2020, Samier Tadros, a resident of Daytona Beach, Florida, alleged that DiMarzio had sexually abused him during private catechism classes at ages six to seven in 1979 and 1980 when DiMarzio was at Holy Rosary Church in Jersey City. Tadros sought $20,000,000 in compensation. DiMarzio denied Tadros claims, and in a statement to the Associated Press, his attorney wrote, "We have uncovered conclusive evidence of Bishop DiMarzio's innocence." DiMarzio stated that Tadros was never a member of Holy Rosary Parish and did not attend Holy Rosary Academy. In addition, DiMarzio did not give private lessons to children that young. In February 2021, Tadros filed a lawsuit against DiMarzio and the Archdiocese of Newark.

In September 2021 the Archdiocese of Newark announced that the Congregation of the Doctrine of the Faith at the Vatican found the accusations by Matzek and Tadros against DiMarzio “not to have the semblance of truth”.

== Views ==
=== Abortion ===
DiMarzio expressed his opposition to abortion rights for women during homilies. He participated in processions from area churches to local clinics that provided abortion services. DiMarzio joined with some other New York City religious leaders in January 2011 to call for new efforts to lower New York City's abortion rate.

=== Manhattan Declaration and COVID pandemic ===
In November 2009, DiMarzio signed the Manhattan Declaration. In 2020, DiMarzio opposed attendance limits on church services gatherings during the COVID-19 pandemic.

=== Immigration ===
DiMarzio worked for migrants and immigrants since beginning as a priest in Jersey City. When he was appointed by John Paul II to the Diocese of Brooklyn, DiMarzio called it a recognition of Brooklyn's status as a "Diocese of Immigrants" DiMarzio testified before committees of the U.S. House of Representatives. He lobbied Congress for more lenient laws while serving as head of the USCCB Office of Migration and Refugee Services.

=== Vocations ===
The number of seminarians for the Diocese of Brooklyn increased while DiMarzio was bishop, increasing from 39 between 2006 and 2007 to 61 in between 2010 and 2011. He worked with other dioceses and seminaries in the U.S. to receive seminarians from Haiti, South Korea, Vietnam, and Poland. DiMarzio requested that each parish in the diocese establish a Parish Vocation Committee (PVC) and, as of May 2011, there were close to 140 PVCs in Brooklyn and Queens. He also held an annual jubilee celebration for priests and religious, and twice-yearly gatherings with seminarians.

DiMarzio established the John Paul II House of Discernment in April 2008, which serves as both a residence for seminarians and a location for discernment events, including retreats. He also supported the Cathedral Preparatory Seminary, the Cathedral Seminary House of Formation, and the Vocation Office.

DiMarzio consecrated Bishops Frank Joseph Caggiano, Octavio Cisneros, and Guy Sansaricq to the episcopate in a rare triple consecration. The ticketed attendance for the event of more than 1,000 included an "unusually high number of cardinals, archbishops and other VIPs - 48, in all, including the four active auxiliaries in the Archdiocese of New York and Cardinal Edward Egan." The consecration elicited "prolonged applause" from the attendees.

== See also ==
- Catholic Church hierarchy
- Catholic Church in the United States
- Historical list of the Catholic bishops of the United States
- List of Catholic bishops of the United States
- Lists of patriarchs, archbishops, and bishops

Catholic Church titles
Preceded by Thomas Vose Daily	Bishop of Brooklyn; 2003–2021	Succeeded by Robert J. Brennan
Preceded by James T. McHugh	Bishop of Camden; 1999–2003	Succeeded by Joseph Anthony Galante
Preceded by –	Auxiliary Bishop of Newark; 1996–1999	Succeeded by –
