= Joseph Peter Michael Denning =

American prelate

- Auxiliary Bishop of Brooklyn
- In office: 1959-1982

Orders
- Ordination: March 21, 1953
- Consecration: April 22, 1959

Personal details
- Born: January 4, 1907 Flushing, Queens
- Died: February 12, 1990 (aged 83)
- Denomination: Roman Catholic

Joseph Peter Michael Denning (January 4, 1907 – February 12, 1990) was an American prelate of the Roman Catholic Church who served as auxiliary bishop of the Diocese of Brooklyn, New York from 1959 to 1982.

== Biography ==
Born in Flushing, Queens, Denning was ordained to the priesthood on March 21, 1953, for the Diocese of Brooklyn.

On February 24, 1959, Denning was named titular bishop of Mallus and auxiliary bishop of the Brooklyn Diocese and was consecrated bishop on April 22, 1959.

He retired on April 13, 1982.

On May 19, 1962, Denning's car accidentally struck the drum and bugle corps of St. Rita's RC Church in Long Island City, Queens, New York. Denning had been on the way to officiate at a confirmation ceremony at the church. The band had assembled to march to the church before the service. Denning stopped his car behind the band, and several people asked him to join the procession. As he stepped out of the car, it started to roll forward. Denning attempted to brake the car, but he claimed that he must have stepped on the gas pedal causing the car to lurch forward, striking the band and injuring 19 children. Three children were seriously injured, including two who were trapped under the car and were dragged several feet.

Catholic Church titles
Preceded by –	Auxiliary Bishop of Brooklyn; 1959 – 1982	Succeeded by –
