= Frank Caggiano =

American Catholic prelate (born 1959)

His Excellency, The Most Reverend Frank Caggiano
- Bishop of Bridgeport
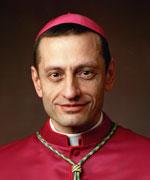
- Church: Catholic
- Diocese: Bridgeport
- Appointed: July 31, 2013
- Installed: September 19, 2013
- Predecessor: William E. Lori
- Previous posts: Auxiliary Bishop of Brooklyn and Titular Bishop of Inis Cathaig (2006-2013)

Orders
- Ordination: May 16, 1987 by Francis John Mugavero
- Consecration: August 22, 2006 by Nicholas Anthony DiMarzio, Thomas Vose Daily, and Ignatius Anthony Catanello

Personal details
- Born: March 29, 1959 (age 67) Gravesend, Brooklyn, New York, U.S.
- Education: Regis High School
- Alma mater: Yale University; Cathedral College; Seminary of the Immaculate Conception; Pontifical Gregorian University
- Motto: Jesus Christ is Lord

Ordination history
History
Priestly ordination
- Ordained by: Francis John Mugavero
Episcopal consecration
- Principal consecrator: Nicholas Anthony DiMarzio
- Co-consecrators: Thomas Vose Daily, and Ignatius Anthony Catanello
- Styles
- Reference style: His Excellency; The Most Reverend
- Spoken style: Your Excellency
- Religious style: Bishop

Frank Joseph Caggiano (born March 29, 1959) is an American Catholic prelate who serves as bishop of Bridgeport in Connecticut. He previously served as an auxiliary bishop of the Diocese of Brooklyn in New York City from 2006 to 2013.

== Biography ==
=== Early life ===
Caggiano was born on March 29, 1959, in the Gravesend section of Brooklyn, New York, the younger of two children of Arnaldo and Gennarina Caggiano. His parents were Italian immigrants who came to the United States in 1958 from the town of Caggiano, in the province of Salerno. He has an older sister, Antonia. His parents originally wanted to name him Francesco after his grandfather, however, a nurse mistakenly placed Frank on birth forms, which his parents reluctantly accepted.

Caggiano grew up in southern Brooklyn on Van Sicklen Street. He attended mass each Sunday morning at their parish of Saints Simon and Jude. He attended Saints Simon and Jude Elementary School in Gravesend and graduated from Regis High School in Manhattan in 1977. He then entered Yale University in New Haven, Connecticut, as a political science major.

While at Yale, Caggiano decided to explore the priesthood. This decision disappointed Arnaldo Caggiano, who opposed his son's priestly inclinations, even though Caggiano himself was still unsure of his vocation. In 1978, Frank Caggiano entered Cathedral College in Douglaston, Queens, graduating with a Bachelor of Philosophy degree in 1981.

After graduating from Cathedral College, Caggiano worked for the Gregg Division of McGraw Hill Publishing Company for 18 months. He then entered the Seminary of the Immaculate Conception in Huntington, New York, earning a Master of Divinity degree.

=== Priesthood ===
Caggiano was ordained a priest for the Diocese of Brooklyn by Bishop Francis Mugavero on May 16, 1987, at the Immaculate Conception Center Chapel in Douglaston. After his 1987 ordination, the diocese assigned Caggiano as associate pastor at Saint Agatha Parish in Bay Ridge and at Saint Athanasius Parish in Bensonhurst, both neighborhoods in Brooklyn.

In 1991, Caggiano went to Rome to reside at the Pontifical North American College while studying at the Pontifical Gregorian University. He received a Doctor of Sacred Theology in May 1996 for a thesis entitled: The Eschatological Implications of the Notion of Recreation in the Works of St. Cyril of Alexandria.

After returning to Brooklyn in June 1996, the diocese assigned Caggiano as associate pastor of Saint Jude Parish in Canarsie. He was also named as dean of formation for the Permanent Diaconate Program and as censor librorum for the diocese. The diocese transferred Caggiano in 1998 to serve as pastor of Saint Dominic's Parish in Bensonhurst in 1998. During this period, he also taught theology at the Staten Island campus of Saint John's University and at Saint Joseph's College in Brooklyn. He also preached at the Youth 2000 Summer Festival in Tipperary, Ireland.

Bishop Thomas Daily named Caggiano as director of the Permanent Diaconate Office in 2002. Caggiano was raised to the rank of papal chaplain by Pope John Paul II in 2003. In 2004, Bishop Nicholas DiMarzio appointed Caggiano as vicar for evangelization and pastoral life.

=== Auxiliary bishop of Brooklyn ===
On June 6, 2006, Caggiano was appointed as an auxiliary bishop of Brooklyn and titular bishop of Inis Cathaig by Pope Benedict XVI. He received his episcopal consecration on August 22, 2006, from DiMarzio, with Bishops Thomas Daily and Ignatius Catanello serving as co-consecrators.

Caggiano participated in several World Youth Day gatherings, delivering catechetical talks at gatherings in Sydney (2008), Madrid (2011) and Rio de Janeiro (2013). In 2009, the diocese closed fourteen Catholic schools; DiMarzio selected Caggiano to lead the reorganization effort. The diocese conceded that the reorganization would probably result in job cuts. DiMarzio also tasked Caggiano with consolidating 46 parishes and reducing the number of Catholic grade schools from 108 to about 65 or 70 while converting the rest into independent Catholic academies.

=== Bishop of Bridgeport ===
On July 31, 2013, Pope Francis appointed Caggiano as bishop of Bridgeport. He was installed there on September 19, 2013. One of Caggiano's first actions as bishop was to announce the financial deficit of the diocese. He also mandated that pastors serve six-year renewable terms at parishes and that they submit their resignations as pastors to the bishop when they turned age 75.

In 2014, Caggiano convoked the fourth diocesan synod, the first in Bridgeport in 32 years (called "Building Bridges to the Future Together"). In a 2014 interview with America Magazine, Caggiano said that he wanted to reach out to the large number of Catholics in the diocese who do not attend mass. The major concerns of the synod included the decline in mass attendance and sacramental reception and the declining enrollment Catholic schools.

In April 2019, the Murphy Center of Fairfield University in Fairfield, Connecticut, awarded Caggiano the "Bowler Award". In November 2019, Caggiano was elected to the board of Catholic Relief Services and then named to a three-year term as its chair. Caggiano said on November 25, 2019, that it was an honor for him to lead an organization dedicated to people "who don't have enough to eat or a place to sleep because of entrenched poverty".

In 2018, Caggiano announced that the diocese would revise its liturgical norms and regulations over the next four years as a result of discussions from the diocesan synod. He said that these new regulations would "allow us to pray effectively and reverently as a Church" and would be the newest norms implemented since 1983.

During the COVID-19 pandemic in 2020, Caggiano stopped public masses on a temporary basis to avoid contagion, going to livestream masses. He said that closing churches was "our common moral obligation to protect human life" and reduce transmission in the virus. Additionally, he noted on Facebook that suspending all public masses was important for community safety, and was in accordance to "the central Catholic belief in the sanctity of every human life". However, the diocese also announced that one particular format for the mass in person would be arranged to social distancing norms for only 50 people while others can participate via their car in parking lots. As the pandemic eased, Caggiano announced an easing in restrictions on mass attendance.

Caggiano maintains a Facebook and Twitter account that he uses for regular postings. In June 2021, Caggiano announced the formation and development of a national catechetical institute. The initiative is to include Hispanic inculturation. The virtual launch was set for December 2020, with a live conference anticipated in Baltimore by November 2022.

==== Sexual abuse reporting ====
Caggiano commissioned a report released in October 2019 from former state Superior Court Judge Robert Holzberg into the Diocese's handling of accusations of sexual abuse by its priests. Holzberg found that since 1953 some 71 priests had abused almost 300 people, with most cases dating to the 1960s and 1970s and none since 2008. He detailed how three bishops over forty years had consistently failed to fulfill their moral and legal responsibilities. Caggiano also said on October 3, 2019, that victims "need to remain at the center of all of our efforts because they are our brothers and sisters" which meant that "moving forward does not mean leaving them behind".

== Viewpoints ==
=== Abortion ===
In June 1997, Caggiano stated that life must be preserved and defended from the moment of conception since an unborn child was "of infinite value" due to its origins in God's love. Caggiano on January 25, 2019, referred to the legalization of abortion rights for women as disturbing and as a failure on the part of contemporary American society.

=== Clerical sex abuse scandal ===
Caggiano told the National Catholic Reporter in 2014 that it was important "to rebuild trust in the Church, among people in the Church", particularly with those younger people who leave due to feeling scandalized by the impact the crisis has. He said that rebuilding trust was dependent upon transparency and authenticity which he hoped to demonstrate consistently in his episcopacy.

=== Euthanasia ===
In June 1997, Caggiano stated that "contemporary society continues to undermine all attempts to respect and defend human life", referring to an imminent U.S. Supreme Court ruling on physician-assisted suicide which Caggiano said "represents a subtle form of euthanasia". He said that it contributed to a "culture of death" that would usher in dramatic societal shifts towards life and death.

=== Interfaith dialogue ===
On December 22, 2015, Caggiano attended a prayer service with Jewish and Muslim leaders in front of the Margaret E. Morton Government Center in Bridgeport "to alert people to the sin of discrimination and to stand in solidarity with those who are in need". He decried attacks motivated by religious discrimination and hatred, noting the "growing menace of terrorism and violence" in a Facebook post he wrote shortly after the event. He also noted that "unfortunately there are few who, in the name of God, are perpetrating terrible acts of evil". Caggiano pointed out that different religions needed to come together to reject religiously motivated violence in order "to search for peace, understanding and a spirit of tolerance".

Caggiano also condemned the spraying of antisemitic graffiti at the diocesan cathedral, referring to "this brazen and disgusting display of antisemitism which is morally abhorrent and an affront to our Catholic faith" in a statement issued on January 5, 2019. He further said that "to use a clearly anti-Semitic symbol is participating in unspeakable evil" and that it was a distressing occurrence given that there was a growing need to mutually respect other religions.

=== Racism ===
Caggiano issued a statement on Twitter following the murder of George Floyd in Minneapolis, Minnesota, in May 2020. Caggiano said that "we must once again confront the evil of systematic racism, bigotry, and discrimination in our country".

=== Same-sex marriage ===
In 2015, Caggiano condemned the US Supreme Court's decision that same-sex marriages were constitutional. Caggiano joined other Catholic dioceses in opposing the ruling, saying that the decision was indicative of "rapidly shifting attitudes in our secular American society", however, pointing out that this did not deter the church's official magisterium or "its understanding of sacramental marriage". Caggiano further stated that "the Church clearly teaches that the sacrament of marriage is a covenant of love that can be entered into only by a man and a woman", and that a change in civil law proved that the Catholic Church needed "to become a more welcoming Church".

=== Youth ===
In an interview with the National Catholic Register on July 10, 2017, Caggiano said that young people "are facing their own unique challenges and want someone to listen to them". He said that pastors need to use technological innovations to reach these youth and draw them closer to the Catholic Church. Caggiano further said that striving for personal holiness and to "proclaim the Good News" were focal points for a youth ministry so that the youth were not forgotten. Having attended several World Youth Day events, Caggiano said that it was exceptional to see millions of young people gathering together from all parts of the world under a common faith.

Caggiano attended the 2018 Synod of Bishops in Rome that was dedicated to the youth. Caggiano said that the Catholic Church needed to act transparently to gain the trust of young people disaffected by the clerical sex scandals. He further said that there was a need to make outreach to young people a crucial pastoral focus for any episcopacy.

== See also ==
- Catholic Church hierarchy
- Catholic Church in the United States
- Historical list of the Catholic bishops of the United States
- List of Catholic bishops of the United States
- Lists of patriarchs, archbishops, and bishops

Catholic Church titles
Preceded by -	Auxiliary Bishop of Brooklyn; 6 June 2006 – 31 July 2013	Succeeded by -
Preceded by John Edward Heaps	— TITULAR — Titular Bishop of Inis Cathaig; 6 June 2006 – 31 July 2013	Succeeded by Josef Graf
Preceded by William Edward Lori	Bishop of Bridgeport; 31 July 2013 –	Incumbent
