= St. Augustine's Church (Brooklyn) =

Roman Catholic Church in Brooklyn, New York

Coordinates: 40°40′42.5″N 73°58′35.5″W

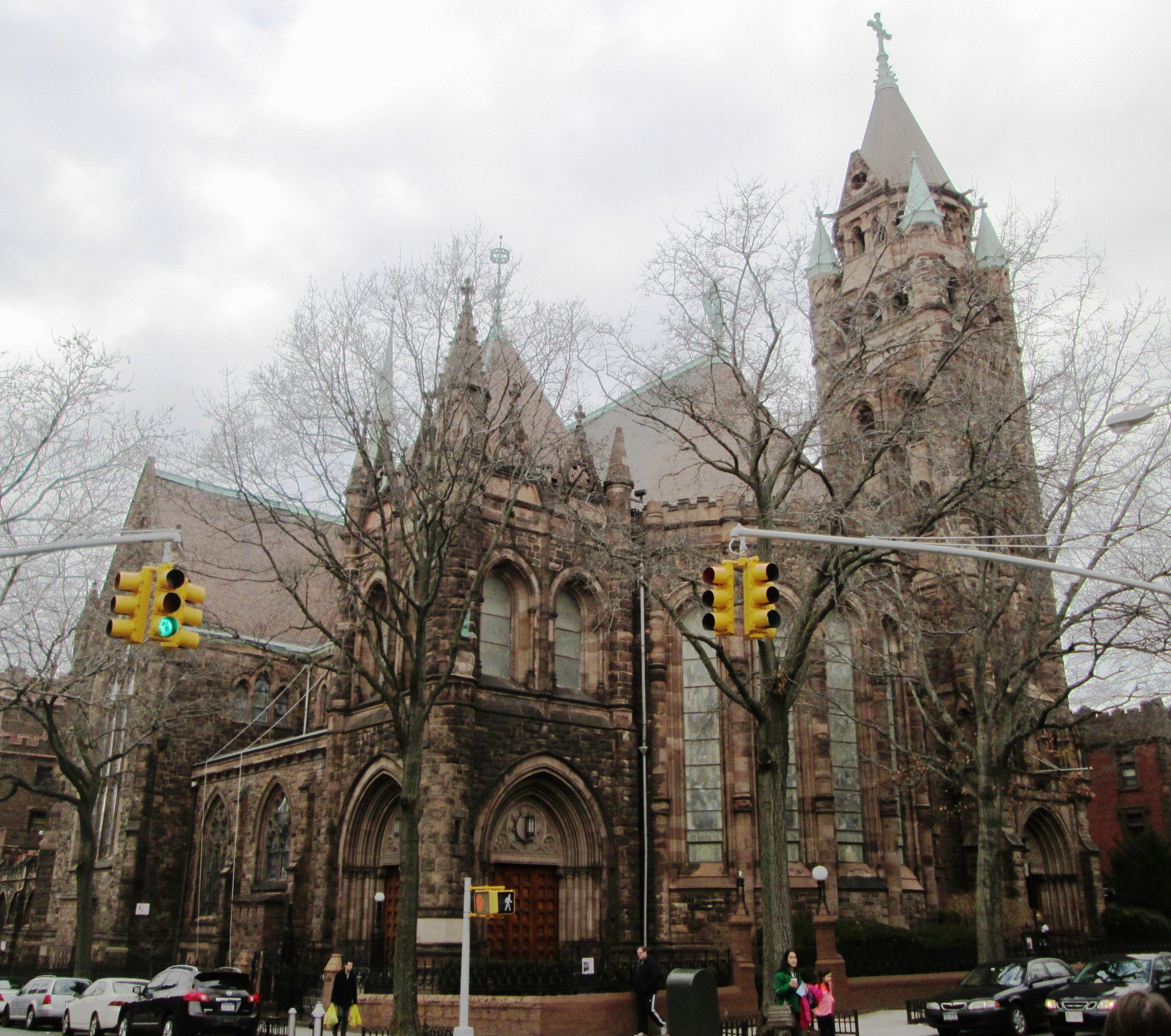
St. Augustine's Church, 2013

St. Augustine's Church is a Catholic parish in Park Slope, Brooklyn, New York City.

== Tabernacle ==
In May 2022, the church’s gold tabernacle worth approximately $2 million was stolen. The stolen tabernacle was designed by Alfred Parfitt.
