= Francis Mugavero =

American prelate (1914–1991)

His Excellency, The Most Reverend Francis John Mugavero
- Bishop of Brooklyn
- Church: Roman Catholic Church
- See: Roman Catholic Diocese of Brooklyn
- In office: 1968 to 1990
- Predecessor: Bryan Joseph McEntegart
- Successor: Thomas Vose Daily

Orders
- Ordination: May 18, 1940 by Thomas Edmund Molloy
- Consecration: September 12, 1968 by Luigi Raimondi

Personal details
- Born: June 8, 1914 Brooklyn, New York, US
- Died: July 12, 1991 (aged 77) East Hampton, New York, US
- Denomination: Roman Catholic
- Education: Cathedral College of the Immaculate Conception; Seminary of the Immaculate Conception
- Motto: Love one another

Francis John Mugavero (June 8, 1914 – July 12, 1991) was an American Catholic prelate who served as bishop of Brooklyn in New York from 1968 to 1990.

== Early life ==
Francis Mugavero (pronounced Ma-GUV-e-ro) was born on June 8, 1914, in the Bedford-Stuyvesant section of Brooklyn and grew up over his father's barber shop. He studied at Cathedral College in Brooklyn and the Seminary of the Immaculate Conception in Huntington, New York. Mugavero received a Master of Social Work degree from Fordham University in the Bronx .

== Priesthood ==
Mugavero was ordained a priest for the Diocese of Brooklyn by Bishop Thomas Edmund Molloy in Brooklyn on May 18, 1940, at age 25.In 1965, Mugavero served as master of ceremonies at the Vatican Pavilion of the New York World's Fair in Queens during the papal visit of Pope Paul VI. Mugavero eventually ran the diocesan branch of Catholic Charities.

== Bishop of Brooklyn ==
On July 15, 1968, Paul VI named Mugavero as the fifth bishop of Brooklyn. He became the first Brooklyn native and the first Italian-American to become bishop of the diocese. Mugavero was consecrated at Our Lady of Perpetual Help Church in Brooklyn on September 12, 1968. His consecrator was Archbishop Luigi Raimondi, with Archbishop Terence Cooke and Bishop John Joseph Boardman as co-consecrators.

In 1971, Mugavero established the Catholic Migration Office to serve immigrants and refugees in the diocese. The diocese established its first apostolates in 1972 for the Italian, Haitian, Polish, Korean, Croatian, and Spanish communities. Mugavero often called Brooklyn "the diocese of immigrants," and was proud that mass was celebrated there in 14 languages.

The Nehemiah Project was formally announced by Mugavero and the East Brooklyn Churches in June, 1982. Named for Nehemiah, the biblical prophet who oversaw the reconstruction of the walls of Jerusalem, the plan was to build homes on vacant land in eastern Brooklyn and offer the homes to low income buyers buyers. By 1985, the Nehemiah Project had constructed 300 row houses in the Brownsville section of Brooklyn at an average cost of $51,000. The project sold the homes to families with incomes averaging less than $25,000.

In 1970, Veronica Lueken, a resident of the Bayside section of Queens, claimed to have seen her first apparition of the Virgin Mary. Over the next 25 years, she reported more apparitions of Mary, along with those of Jesus Christ and some of the saints. Lueken reported receiving messages criticizing the changes from the Second Vatican Council, the revival of the permanent diaconate and other reforms in the Catholic Church. In 1986, Mugavero issued a declaration concerning Lueken's visions;

"I, the undersigned Diocesan Bishop of Brooklyn, in my role as the legitimate shepherd of this particular Church, wish to confirm the constant position of the Diocese of Brooklyn that a thorough investigation revealed that the alleged "visions of Bayside" completely lacked authenticity".

In 1987, Mugavero established the Immaculate Conception Center at the site of the former Cathedral College. Mugavero was a founder of the Campaign for Human Development, an annual fund-raising drive in the diocese for the poor.

== Retirement and legacy ==
On February 20, 1990, at age 75, Mugavero retired as bishop of Brooklyn, celebrating his final public mass at Our Lady of Refuge Church in Brooklyn. He died from heart failure on July 12, 1991, while vacationing in East Hampton, New York. According to The New York Times, he left a proud legacy, more compassionate and charitable than political.

- The Bishop Francis J. Mugavero Center in Brooklyn is a memory care facility for the elderly.
- The Bishop Mugavero Senior Apartments are located in Brooklyn

The New York State Catholic Conference Council of Catholic Charities Directors created the Bishop Mugavero Award. It recognizes individuals who make a significant and sustained contribution to the work of charity and social justice in New York.

== Views ==
=== Abortion ===
Mugavero issued more than 20 pastoral letters strongly condemning abortion rights for woman. He tended, however, to avoid public criticism of pro-choice Catholic politicians, choosing to speak about it privately with those individuals.

=== Sexuality ===
In February 1976, Mugavero issued a pastoral letter, "Sexuality - God's Gift", defending the legitimate rights of all people, including gay people. He said that gay people had been "subject to misunderstanding and at times unjust discrimination". He also said,

On a more personal level, we wish to express our concern and compassion for those men and women who experience pain and confusion due to a true homosexual orientation. We pray that through all the spiritual and pastoral means available they will recognize Christ's and the Church's love for them and our hope that they will come to live in His peace.

Catholic Church titles
Preceded by Bryan Joseph McEntegart	Bishop of Brooklyn; 1968–1990	Succeeded by Thomas Vose Daily
