= Thomas Edmund Molloy =

American prelate

His Excellency, The Most Reverend Thomas Edmund Molloy
- Bishop of Brooklyn; Archbishop (personal title)
- Church: Roman Catholic Church
- Diocese: Roman Catholic Diocese of Brooklyn
- In office: 1922 to 1956
- Predecessor: Charles Edward McDonnell
- Successor: Bryan Joseph McEntegart
- Previous posts: President of St. Joseph College for Women; Auxiliary Bishop of Brooklyn (1920 to 1921)

Orders
- Ordination: September 19, 1908 by Pietro Respighi
- Consecration: October 3, 1920 by Charles Edward McDonnell

Personal details
- Born: September 4, 1885 Nashua, New Hampshire, US
- Died: November 26, 1956 (aged 71) Brooklyn, New York, US
- Education: St. John's Seminary; Pontifical North American College; Pontifical Urban University
- Motto: Salus animarum suprema lex (The salvation of souls is the supreme law)

Thomas Edmund Molloy (September 4, 1885 – November 26, 1956) was an American prelate of the Catholic Church. He served as an bishop of Brooklyn in New York from 1921 until his death in 1956. He previously served as an auxiliary bishop of the diocese from 1920 to 1921. He was given the title of personal archbishop in 1951.

== Biography ==
=== Early life ===
Thomas Molloy was born on September 4, 1885, in Nashua, New Hampshire, the fourth of the eight children of John and Ellen Molloy. He attended Saint Anselm College in Goffstown, New Hampshire, before entering St. Francis College in Brooklyn, New York and graduating in 1904. He then decided to study for the priesthood and enrolled at St. John's Seminary in Brooklyn. He was later sent to study in Rome at the Pontifical North American College and the Pontifical Urban University.

=== Priesthood ===
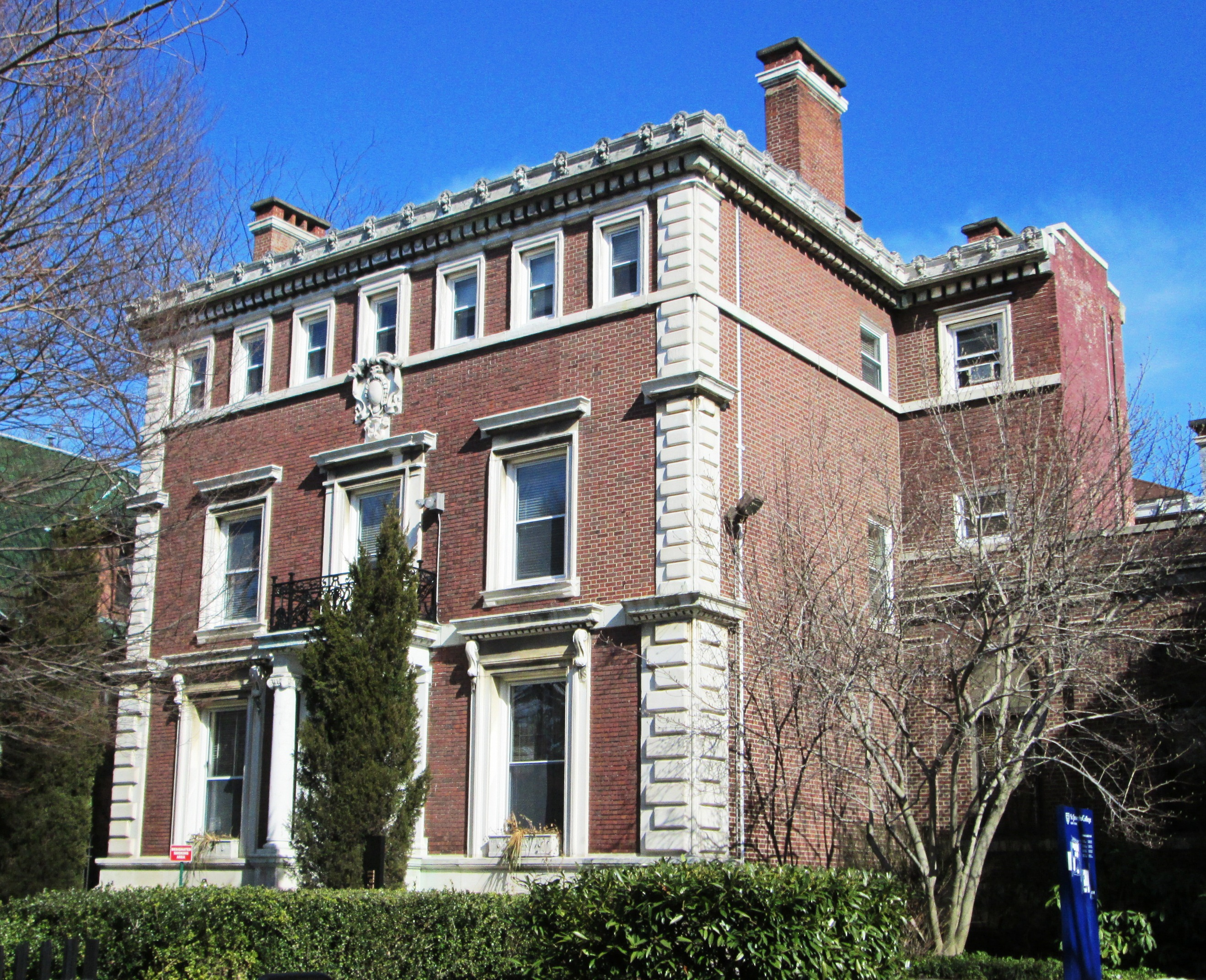
St. Joseph University, Brooklyn, New York (2013)

Molloy was ordained a priest by Cardinal Pietro Respighi in Rome at the North American College for the Diocese of Brooklyn on September 19, 1908.Upon his return to the United States in 1909, the diocese assigned Molloy as a curate at Queen of All Saints Parish in Brooklyn. Bishop George Mundelein later named Molloy as his private secretary. When the Vatican named Mundelein as archbishop of Chicago, Molloy worked with him in Chicago, Illinois, for several months.

After returning to Brooklyn, Molloy joined the faculty of St. Joseph's College for Women, serving as spiritual director and professor of philosophy; he was later named as the college president. It is today St. Joseph's University.

=== Auxiliary Bishop and Bishop of Brooklyn ===
On June 28, 1920, Molloy was appointed as an auxiliary bishop of Brooklyn and titular bishop of Lorea by Pope Benedict XV. He received his episcopal consecration at the Pro-Cathedral of St. James in Brooklyn on October 3, 1920, from Bishop Charles Edward McDonnell, with Bishops Edmund Gibbons and Thomas Joseph Walsh serving as co-consecrators. At age 35, he was one of the youngest members of the American hierarchy.

Following the death of McDonnell in August 1921, Benedict XV appointed Molloy as the third bishop of Brooklyn on November 21, 1921. He was installed on February 15, 1922. During his 35-year-long tenure, the number of Catholics exceeded one million and made the Brooklyn diocese the most populous in the country. He founded the Seminary of the Immaculate Conception in Huntington, New York, in 1930. During the Great Depression of the 1930s, he established a labor school where working men could learn the Catholic principles that apply to trade unionism. He also ordered the diocesan clergy to take courses in industrial issues to better instruct their parishioners.

While bishop, Molloy was a prominent supporter of the Christian Front, an extreme right wing organization. His diocesan newspaper, the Tablet, once addressed the charge that the Christian Front was anti-Semitic: "Well what of it? Just what law was violated?" Pope Pius XII gave Molloy the personal title of archbishop on April 7, 1951.

==== Death and legacy ====
On November 15, 1956, Molloy suffered a stroke and was also diagnosed with pneumonia. He died on November 26, 1956, at his residence in Brooklyn, aged 72.He was originally interred at the Seminary of the Immaculate Conception. However, in 2016 his remains were moved to the Cathedral College of the Immaculate Conception in Queens, New York. The following schools were named after him:

- Archbishop Molloy High School in Queens.
- Molloy Catholic College for Women in Rockville Centre, New York. It is today Molloy University.

Catholic Church titles
Preceded by Charles Edward McDonnell	Bishop of Brooklyn; 1921–1956	Succeeded by Bryan Joseph McEntegart
