= Seminary of the Immaculate Conception =

Former Roman Catholic seminary in Lloyd Harbor, New York, United States

- Type: Seminary
- Active: 1926–2012 (school)
- Religious affiliation: Roman Catholic Diocese of Rockville Centre (1957-2012); Roman Catholic Diocese of Brooklyn (1926-1957)
- Location: 440 West Neck Road, Lloyd Harbor, New York, United States; 40°54′18.2″N 73°28′15.5″W
- Website: www.icseminary.edu

The Seminary of the Immaculate Conception was a Catholic seminary in Lloyd Harbor, New York, accredited by the Association of Theological Schools in the United States and Canada, and serving the Diocese of Rockville Centre. It offered a number of academic degrees, primarily those of Master of Divinity (MDiv) and Doctor of Ministry (DMin).

== History ==
The seminary was founded in 1926 in a house in Lloyd Harbor acquired by Thomas E. Molloy, Bishop of the Diocese of Brooklyn, which at that time covered all of Long Island. It was an expansion of the original school, St. John's Seminary, located in Brooklyn and staffed by the priests of the Congregation of the Mission as a part of their historic commitment to the education of the clergy of the Catholic Church. It began with 25 students studying at the collegiate level. The construction of the new building to house the seminary was completed in 1930 and classes were offered there in September of that year. The student body at that point was 85 seminarians in the two-year college level and the school of theology. In time, the property expanded to include Roland Ray Conklin's famous "Rosemary Farm" estate and amphitheater, which was built in 1907.

Due to the expanding population in the suburban counties of Nassau and Suffolk, in 1957 the Holy See separated them from the Diocese of Brooklyn. It established the Diocese of Rockville Centre to serve them. The two dioceses agreed to share the operation of the seminary. Ten years later the college level segment of the school was discontinued. With the changing needs of ministry in the Catholic Church in the following decades, new programs and degrees began to be offered.

In 1990, Rosemary Farm, under the ownership of the Seminary, suffered a significant fire after being abandoned, and was almost entirely torn down. The ruins, consisting of a doorway, the amphitheater, and the stable complex, have since been preserved.

=== Seminarian program ends ===
In November 2011, it was announced that the seminary would stop training new priests as of September 2012. Instead, the Diocese of Rockville Centre merged their seminary program with the Diocese of Brooklyn and the Archdiocese of New York at St. Joseph's Seminary in Yonkers. As of January 2024, the seminary continues to offer theological courses, including a master's degree in theology to the general public, as "a satellite campus of St. Joseph Seminary".

=== Library closure ===
The library continued to operate after the end of the seminarian theology program, but closed its doors on December 16, 2020. It housed Catholic, Protestant, and theological texts and contained their own private archive of rare books.

== Current usage ==
The seminary building continues to host retreats for Catholic schools and colleges and other Catholic groups such as the Knights of Columbus.

== See also ==
- List of defunct colleges and universities in New York
