= John Charles Dunne =

American prelate

His Excellency, The Most Reverend John Charles Dunne
- Auxiliary Bishop Emeritus of Rockville Centre; Titular Bishop of Abercornia
- Archdiocese: New York
- Diocese: Rockville Centre
- Appointed: October 21, 1988
- Installed: December 13, 1988
- Retired: June 22, 2013
- Other post: Titular Bishop of Abercornia

Orders
- Ordination: June 1, 1963 by Walter P. Kellenberg
- Consecration: December 13, 1988 by John R. McGann, James Joseph Daly, and Alfred John Markiewicz

Personal details
- Born: October 30, 1937 (age 89) Brooklyn, New York, US
- Motto: God is love

Styles of John Charles Dunne
- Reference style: His Excellency; The Most Reverend
- Spoken style: Your Excellency
- Religious style: Bishop

John Charles Dunne (born October 30, 1937) is an American prelate of the Roman Catholic Church. Dunn served as an auxiliary bishop of the Diocese of Rockville Centre in New York from 1988 until 2013.

== Biography ==
=== Early life ===
John Dunne was born on October 30, 1937, in Brooklyn, New York, to Mark and Helen Dunne. His only brother, Mark J. Dunne, was a priest of the Diocese of Rockville Centre.

Dunn attended the parochial school of St. Boniface Parish in Elmont, New York and then went to St. Francis Preparatory School in Brooklyn. He went to Cathedral College in Brooklyn before entering the Seminary of the Immaculate Conception in Huntington, New York.

=== Priesthood ===
Dunn was ordained to the priesthood for the Diocese of Rockville Centre by Bishop Walter Philip Kellenberg on June 1, 1963. Dunne served as a curate at St. Anthony of Padua Parish in East Northport, New York, and was later named associate director of the Confraternity of Christian Doctrine and of the Family Life Bureau.

In 1970, he became spiritual director of the Seminary of the Immaculate Conception, where he remained until he was appointed associate vicar for religious. In 1974, Dunn was named a curate at Corpus Christi Parish in Mineola, New York, and in 1978 director of the Priest Personnel Office. In 1984, Dunn was appointed pastor of Blessed Sacrament Parish in Valley Stream, New York.

=== Auxiliary Bishop of Rockville Centre ===
On October 21, 1988, Dunne was appointed as an auxiliary bishop of Rockville Centre and titular bishop of Abercornia by Pope John Paul II. He was consecrated on December 13, 1988, by Bishop John McGann, with Bishops James Daly and Alfred Markiewicz serving as co-consecrators at St. Agnes Cathedral in Rockville Centre. Dunn selected as his episcopal motto: "God Is Love" from 1 John 4:16.

As a member of the United States Conference of Catholic Bishops, Dunne served as chair of the Bishops' Committee on Science and Human Values and of the Committee on Women in Society and in the Church.

On June 22, 2013, Pope Francis accepted Dunn's letter of resignation as auxiliary bishop of Rockville Centre.

== See also ==
- Catholic Church hierarchy
- Catholic Church in the United States
- Historical list of the Catholic bishops of the United States
- List of Catholic bishops of the United States
- Lists of patriarchs, archbishops, and bishops

== Episcopal succession ==
Catholic Church titles
Preceded by –	Auxiliary Bishop of Rockville Centre; 1988–2013	Succeeded by –
