= Vincent John Baldwin =

American prelate

- Auxiliary Bishop of Rockville Centre
- Church: Catholic Church
- Diocese: Rockville Centre
- Appointed: June 4, 1962
- In office: 1962–1979
- Other post: Titular bishop of Bencenna (1962–79)
- Previous posts: Vice-chancellor of the Diocese of Brooklyn (1949–53); Pastor of St. Boniface Martyr Church (1953–56); Pastor of St. Aloysius Church (1956–60); Vicar general of the Diocese of Rockville Centre (1957); Papal chamberlain (1958); Domestic prelate (1959); Pastor of St. Joseph Church (1960)

Orders
- Ordination: July 26, 1931 by Cardinal Francesco Marchetti Selvaggiani
- Consecration: July 26, 1962 by Bishop Walter P. Kellenberg

Personal details
- Born: July 13, 1907 Brooklyn, New York, United States
- Died: September 16, 1979 (aged 72) West Islip, New York, United States
- Buried: St. John Cemetery
- Education: S.T.D., Almo Collegio Capranica

Vincent John Baldwin (July 13, 1907 – September 16, 1979) was an American prelate of the Catholic Church. He served as an auxiliary bishop of the Diocese of Rockville Centre from 1962 until his death in 1979.

== Biography ==
Vincent Baldwin was born in the Williamsburg section of Brooklyn, New York, to John O. and Josepha (née Haefelei) Baldwin. He attended parochial schools in Brooklyn, and graduated from Cathedral College in 1926. He attended Immaculate Conception Seminary in Huntington, New York before studying at the Almo Collegio Capranica in Rome, where he earned a doctorate in theology. He was ordained to the priesthood in Rome on July 26, 1931.

Following his return to Brooklyn, Baldwin served as a curate at Holy Name of Jesus Church until 1943, when he became a member of the diocesan matrimonial tribunal. He served as secretary of the tribunal (1944–49) and vice-chancellor of the Diocese of Brooklyn (1949–53). In addition to his pastoral duties, he was a judge of the matrimonial tribunal from 1954 to 1957. He served as pastor of St. Boniface Martyr Church in Sea Cliff (1953–56) and of St. Aloysius Church in Great Neck (1956–60). He became vicar general of the Diocese of Rockville Centre in 1957, and was later named a papal chamberlain (1948) and domestic prelate (1959). He became pastor of St. Joseph Church in Garden City in 1960.

On June 4, 1962, Baldwin was appointed auxiliary bishop of Rockville Centre and titular bishop of Bencenna by Pope John XXIII. He received his episcopal consecration on the following July 26 from Bishop Walter P. Kellenberg, with Bishops James Griffiths and Charles Richard Mulrooney serving as co-consecrators, at St. Agnes Cathedral. As an auxiliary bishop, he continued to serve as vicar general of the diocese and pastor of St. Joseph Church. He attended all four sessions of the Second Vatican Council in Rome between 1962 and 1965.

Baldwin died at Good Samaritan Hospital in West Islip, at age 72.

Catholic Church titles
| Preceded by – | Auxiliary Bishop of Rockville Centre; 1962–1979 | Succeeded by – |
