= Diocese of Rockville Centre =

Latin Catholic jurisdiction in New York, US

Coordinates: 40°39′48″N 73°38′13″W

Diocese of Rockville Centre Dioecesis Petropolitana in Insula Longa
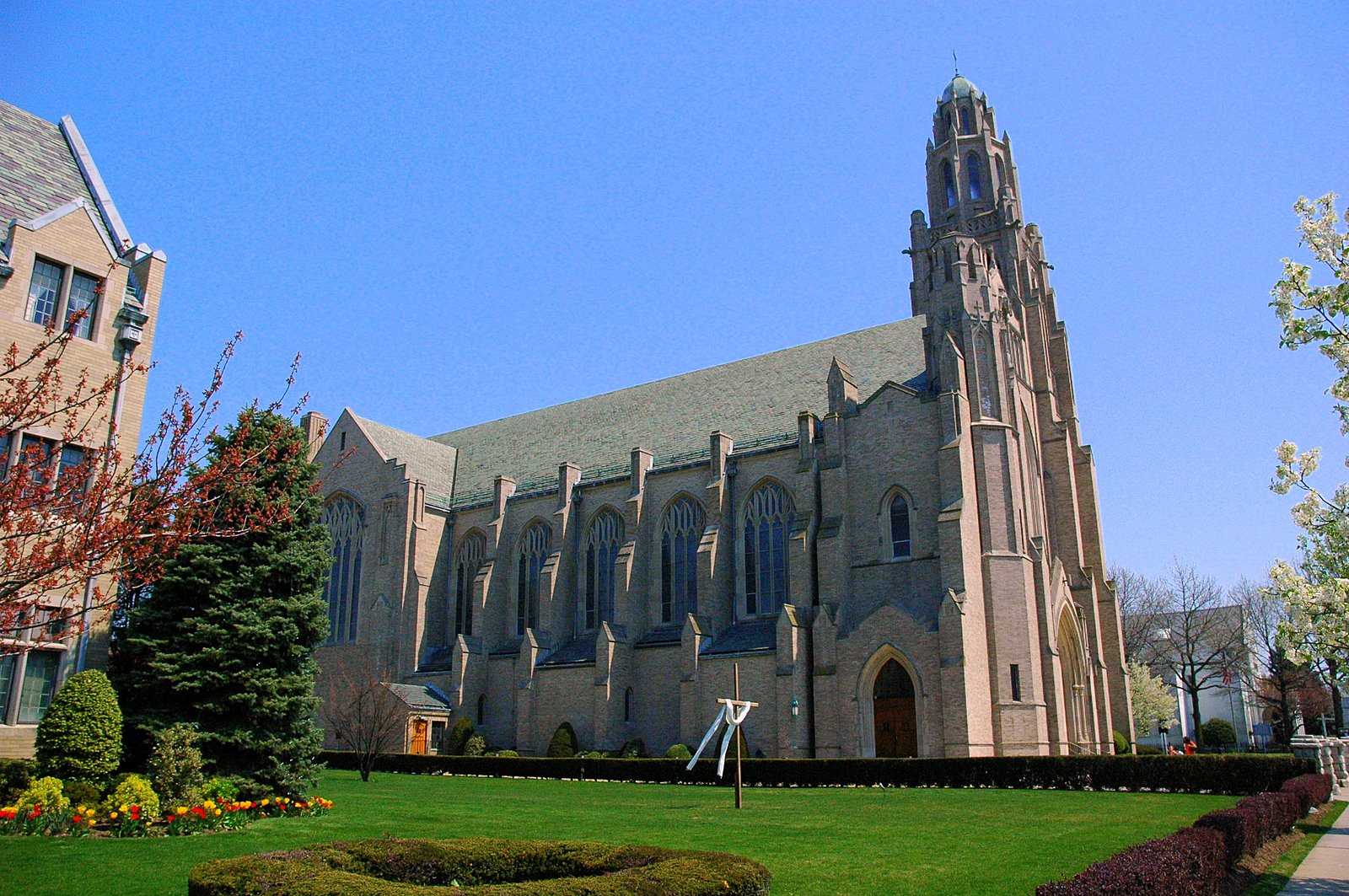
- St. Agnes Cathedral

- Coat of arms

Location
- Country: United States
- Territory: Long Island (except Brooklyn & Queens), New York
- Ecclesiastical province: New York

Statistics
- Population: Total; Catholics: (as of 2014); 2,851,977; 1,531,445 (53.7%)
- Parishes: 134

Information
- Denomination: Catholic
- Sui iuris church: Latin Church
- Rite: Roman Rite
- Established: April 6, 1957
- Cathedral: St. Agnes Cathedral
- Patron saint: Saint Agnes

Current leadership
- Pope: Leo XIV
- Bishop: John Barres
- Metropolitan Archbishop: Ronald Hicks
- Auxiliary Bishops: Andrzej Jerzy Zglejszewski; Robert J. Coyle; Luis Miguel Romero Fernández
- Bishops emeritus: John Charles Dunne

Map
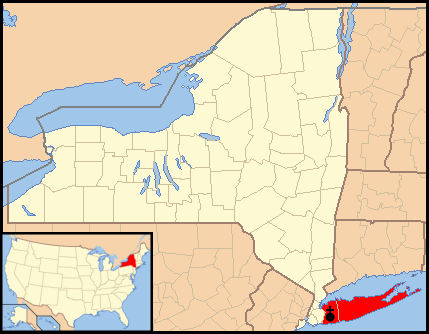

Website
- drvc.org

The Diocese of Rockville Centre (Latin: Dioecesis Petropolitana in Insula Longa, lit. 'Diocese of Rockville on Long Island') is a diocese of the Catholic Church in the Long Island region of the State of New York in the United States. It is a suffragan diocese of the Archdiocese of New York. The bishop is John Barres. The cathedral is St. Agnes Cathedral, in Rockville Centre, New York.

Founded in 1957, this diocese was created from territory that formerly belonged to the Diocese of Brooklyn. It includes all of Nassau and Suffolk counties except for Fishers Island, which is part of the Diocese of Norwich. As of 2005, it is the sixth-largest Catholic diocese in the United States, currently serving approximately 1.5 million people.

== History ==
=== Early history ===
During the Dutch and British rule of the Province of New York in the 17th and 18th centuries, Catholics were banned from the colony. Richard Coote, the first colonial governor, passed a law at the end of the 17th century that mandated a life sentence to any Catholic priest. The penalty for harboring a Catholic was a £250 fine plus three days in the pillory. In 1763, Catholic Bishop Richard Challoner of London stated that:

“...in New York, one may find a Catholic here and there, but they have no opportunity of practicing their religion as no priest visits them, and … there is not much likelihood that Catholic priests will be permitted to enter these provinces."

After the approval of the New York Constitution in 1777, freedom of worship for Catholics was guaranteed.

=== 1784 to 1957 ===
In 1784, Pope Pius VI erected the Apostolic Prefecture of United States of America, including all of the new United States. In 1789, the same pope raised this prefecture to the Diocese of Baltimore. Pope Pius VII in 1808 erected the Diocese of New York, taking all of New York State from the Diocese of Baltimore.

Catholic priests started appearing in Long Island in the mid-19th century, founding missions and parishes. The first Catholic parish in Nassau County was St. Brigid in Westbury, founded in 1840. The first church in Huntington was constructed on West Neck in 1849. The first resident priest in Suffolk County arrived in Sag Harbor in 1852 to provide support to Irish-Catholic families working on the railroads.

The Diocese of Brooklyn was erected by Pope Pius IX in 1853 from territory formerly a part of the Archdiocese of New York. All of Long Island would remain part of the new diocese for the next 104 years. The first Catholic parish in Babylon was St. Joseph, erected in 1877. St. John of God Parish was established in Central Islip in 1895.

In 1955, the Dominican Sisters of Amityville founded Molloy Catholic College for Women on 25 acres in Rockville Centre, which was purchased by the Sisters of St. Dominic. It is today Molloy University.

=== 1957 to 2000 ===
Pope Pius XII erected the Diocese of Rockville Centre on April 6, 1957, taking Nassau and Suffolk counties from the Diocese of Brooklyn. The pope named Bishop Walter P. Kellenberg of the Diocese of Ogdensburg as the first bishop of the new diocese. St. Agnes Cathedral was designated as the diocesan cathedral. Kellenberg founded the diocese's Catholic Charities office in 1957. He resigned in 1976.

Kellenberg was followed by Auxiliary Bishop John McGann, named by Pope Paul VI in 1976. In 1984, the diocese closed its minor seminary, St. Pius X Preparatory, in Uniondale. Pope John Paul II in 1999 appointed Bishop James T. McHugh from the Diocese of Camden as a coadjutor bishop in Rockville Centre to assist McGann.

=== 2000 to 2010 ===
After McGann retired in January 2000, McHugh automatically succeeded him as bishop. However, only 11 months later, McHugh died in December 2000. John Paul II then appointed Auxiliary Bishop William Murphy of the Archdiocese of Boston as the next bishop of Rockville Centre. In May 2000, retired priest Andrew Millar was arrested after a parent caught him sodomizing his 15-year-old developmentally disabled son in a public bathroom. The diocese had retired Millar in 1999 after receiving an abuse complaint dating back to 1991. After pleading guilty, Millar was sentenced in November 2000 to one to three years in prison.

Soon after Murphy's installation as bishop in 2001, citing that the private quarters lacked privacy and sufficient space to entertain visiting clergy, he decided to use the top floor of an old convent building at the cathedral for a new apartment. The diocese had been planning to create rooms for nuns on that floor, but Murphy asked them to accept different accommodations. The Murphy apartment ended up costing the diocese $800,000. As news of the project cost became public, Murphy invited a Newsday reporter and photographer to tour the apartment. Michael Hands of St. Raphael's Parish in East Meadow was arrested in May 2001 after being accused of sexually abusing a 13-year-old boy in 2000 and 2001. As part of a plea agreement, Hands testified before a grand jury in January 2003, where he accused Monsignor Charles Ribaudo of sexually abusing him as a teenager, reporting it to the diocese in 2001. Bishop Murphy removed Ribaudo from ministry at that time. In March 2003, after pleading guilty to abusing the minor, Hands was sentenced to two years in prison and five years probation.

In 2003, 52 priests requested a meeting with Murphy. In a letter, the priests spoke of anger and dissatisfaction within the diocese and "a certain lack of confidence in your pastoral leadership." They also complained about Murphy's management style, the cost of his new apartment, the sexual abuse scandal in Boston and his ban against Long Island Voice of the Faithful. In May 2008, after undergoing treatment in Maryland, Thomas G. Saloy, an administrator at the Queen of the Most Holy Rosary Church in Roosevelt, pleaded guilty to possessing child pornography and was sentenced to three and a half years in prison.

=== 2010 to present ===
In 2011, Murphy announced the closing of six elementary schools in the diocese:

- St. John Baptist de La Salle Regional School in Farmingdale
- St. Catherine of Sienna School in Franklin Square
- St. Ignatius Loyola School in Hicksville
- Sacred Heart School in North Merrick
- Our Lady of Perpetual Help School in Lindenhurst
- Prince of Peace Regional School in Sayville

In 2012, the Archdiocese of New York and the Dioceses of Brooklyn and Rockville Centre merged all their seminary programs.

- The minor seminary program was designated as the Cathedral Seminary House of Formation in Queens
- The major seminary program was set at St. Joseph's Seminary in Yonkers. As a result, the Seminary of the Immaculate Conception in Lloyd Harbor closed that year.

Murphy retired in 2016. The current bishop of Rockville Centre is John Barres from the Diocese of Allentown. He was appointed by Pope Francis in January 2017.

In October 2017, Barres announced the creation of the Independent Reconciliation and Compensation Program (IRCP) for survivors of acts of child sexual abuse committed by clergy. That same year, he created a video series on Telecare, the diocesan television network. Targeted to commuters, the series was entitled "The Catholic Spirituality of Commuter Delays."

In October 2020, Rockville Centre became the fourth diocese in New York State to declare bankruptcy. An April 2021 bankruptcy filing documents allegations against some former priests who had not previously been publicly accused of abuse. In total, the diocese listed 101 accused clergy members, though a committee of unsecured creditors had published a list of 46 more names. In April 2024, a $200 million settlement offer was rejected by 86% of those who were reported to have been sexually abused by clergy. The following September, the diocese agreed to pay $323 million to 530 victims, with $85.3 million of that amount being covered by insurance. The diocese gathered funds for the payment by having all its parishes declare bankruptcy so that its insurers can repurchase policies from them.

== Bishops ==
=== Bishops of Rockville Centre ===
1. Walter P. Kellenberg (1957–1976)
2. John R. McGann (1976–2000)
3. James T. McHugh (2000; coadjutor bishop 1998–2000)
4. William F. Murphy (2001–2017)
5. John O. Barres (2017–present)

=== Current auxiliary bishops ===
- Andrzej Jerzy Zglejszewski (2014–present)
- Robert J. Coyle (2018–present; previously Auxiliary Bishop of the Archdiocese for the Military Services, USA, 2013–2018)
- Luis Miguel Romero Fernández (2020–present)

=== Former auxiliary bishops ===
- Vincent John Baldwin (1962–1979)
- John R. McGann (1971–1976), appointed Bishop of this diocese
- Gerald Augustine John Ryan (1977–1985)
- James Joseph Daly (1977–1996)
- Alfred John Markiewicz (1986–1995), appointed Bishop of Kalamazoo
- Emil Aloysius Wcela (1988–2007)
- John Charles Dunne (1988–2013)
- Paul Henry Walsh (2003–2012)
- Peter Anthony Libasci (2007–2011), appointed Bishop of Manchester
- Nelson J. Perez (2012–2017), appointed Bishop of Cleveland, later Archbishop of Philadelphia
- Robert J. Brennan (2012–2019), appointed Bishop of Columbus, later Bishop of Brooklyn
- Richard Garth Henning (2018–2023), appointed Coadjutor Bishop of the Diocese of Providence, Rhode Island. (now Archbishop Of Archdiocese of Boston

=== Other diocesan priests who became bishops ===
- Robert E. Guglielmone, appointed Bishop of Charleston in 2009
- William Edward Koenig, appointed Bishop of Wilmington in 2021

== Coat of Arms ==
Coat of arms of Diocese of Rockville Centre
Notes Arms was designed and adopted when the diocese was erected Adopted 1957 Escutcheon The arms are divided into four parts, two blue and two gold, with a wavy line border. Three parts include a scallop shell and the fourth part includes a lamb's head. The center of the arms contains a black roundel with three stones. Symbolism The blue and gold quarters appear on the coat of arms of King William III. The scallop shells refer to the Native American name for Long Island, "Seawanhacky" (Island of Shells). The scallop shells also signify the flowing of water in the sacrament of baptism. The wavy lines represent the sea water around the diocese. The lamb's head symbolizes innocence and represents St. Agnes, patron saint of Rockville Centre. The stones derive from the coat of arms of Pope Pius XII. The black roundel represents the black marshes of "Breuck-Landt'" (Broken Land), the seventeenth century name of Brooklyn.

== Media ==
Catholic Faith Network (CFN) formerly known as "Telecare" was founded in 1969 by Monsignor Thomas Hartman. CFN's programming includes live religious services, talk shows, devotional programs, educational programming, entertainment, and children's programs. It also presents coverage of special events at the Vatican and of papal journeys. It serves subscribers in three states.

In 2012, the diocesan weekly newspaper, Long Island Catholic, switched to a subscription-based monthly magazine.

== Education ==
=== Former seminaries ===
- Seminary of the Immaculate Conception – Lloyd Harbor (1926 to 2012) The diocese now uses St. Joseph's Seminary in Yonkers as its major seminary.
- St. Pius X Preparatory Seminary – Uniondale, (1961 to 1984)

=== High schools ===
==== Diocesan ====
- Holy Trinity Diocesan High School – Hicksville (1966)
- St. John the Baptist Diocesan High School – West Islip (1966)

==== Operated by religious orders and independent ====
- Chaminade High School – Mineola, Marianists Fathers and Brothers (1930)
- Kellenberg Memorial High School – Uniondale, Marianists Fathers and Brothers (1987)
- Sacred Heart Academy – Hempstead, Sisters of St. Joseph Brentwood (1949)
- St. Anthony's High School – South Huntington, Franciscan Brothers of Brooklyn (1933)
- St. Dominic High School – Oyster Bay, independent (1928)
- St. Mary's High School – Manhasset, Dominican Sisters of Mary, Mother of the Eucharist (1949)

=== Closed schools ===
- Academy of Saint Joseph – Brentwood, (1856 to 2009)
- Bishop McGann-Mercy Diocesan High School – Riverhead, Sisters of Mercy (1956 to 2018)
- Our Lady of Mercy Academy – Syosset, Sisters of Mercy (1928 to 2024)

== Catholic Charities ==
Catholic Charities of the Diocese of Rockville Centre began operating in 1957. In 1974, it opened a residence for the developmentally disabled in Valley Stream. As of 2019, Catholic Charities operates 13 residences. Catholic Charities opened a shelter for single mothers in 1968 and in 2009 expanded it to include transitional housing. Catholic Charities is one of the largest providers of affordable senior housing on Long Island, operating over 1,300 units.

== Catholic Health ==
Catholic Health System, formerly Catholic Health Services of Long Island, was founded in 1997 and operates under the sponsorship of the Diocese of Rockville Centre. CHS operates six hospitals:

- Good Samaritan University Hospital – West Islip
- Mercy Hospital – Rockville Centre
- St. Catherine of Siena Hospital – Smithtown
- Good Samaritan University Hospital St. Charles Campus – Port Jefferson
- St. Francis Hospital & Heart Center – Flower Hill
- Saint Joseph Hospital – Bethpage

CHS is the primary clinical affiliate and major teaching site of New York Institute of Technology College of Osteopathic Medicine in Old Westbury With 17,000 employees, CHS in 2017 was the third-largest employer on Long Island. In 2021, CHSLI's name was changed to Catholic Health.

== Cemeteries ==
In 2016, the diocese created a new corporation, Catholic Cemeteries of Long Island, to assume ownership of its cemeteries. It administers four major cemeteries:

- Cemetery of the Holy Rood – Westbury
- Holy Sepulchre Cemetery – Coram
- Queen of Peace Cemetery – Old Westbury
- Queen of All Saints Cemetery – Central Islip

In addition, the diocese contains 21 parish cemeteries. Six of them are managed by Catholic Cemeteries of Long Island and the remainder by the individual parishes.

St. Charles / Resurrection Cemeteries, despite being located within the diocese in East Farmingdale, is administered by the Diocese of Brooklyn.
