= Andrzej Jerzy Zglejszewski =

Polish-born Catholic prelate (born 1961)

His Excellency, The Most Reverend Andrzej J. Zglejszewski
- Auxiliary Bishop of Rockville Centre; Titular Bishop of Nicives
- Bishop Zglejszewski in 2014
- Archdiocese: New York
- Diocese: Rockville Centre
- Appointed: February 11, 2014
- Installed: March 25, 2014
- Other post: Titular Bishop of Nicives

Orders
- Ordination: May 26, 1990 by John R. McGann
- Consecration: March 25, 2014 by William Murphy, Robert E. Guglielmone, and Robert J. Brennan

Personal details
- Born: December 18, 1961 (age 64) Czarna Bialostocka, Poland
- Education: Seminary of the Immaculate Conception; Catholic University of America; Fordham University
- Motto: Fiat mihi secundum verbum tuum (May it be done to me according to your word)

Styles of Andrzej Jerzy Zglejszewski
- Reference style: His Excellency; The Most Reverend
- Spoken style: Your Excellency
- Religious style: Bishop

Andrzej Jerzy Zglejszewski (Polish: [ˈandʐɛj ˈjɛʐɨ zɡlɛjˈʂɛfskʲi] (born December 18, 1961) is a Polish-born Catholic prelate who has served as an auxiliary bishop for the Diocese of Rockville Centre in New York since 2014.

== Biography ==
=== Early life and education ===
Andrzej Zglejszewski was born on December 18, 1961, in Czarna Bialostocka, Poland to Tadeusz and Anna Zglejszewski. He has a sister Ewa. Deciding to become a priest, Zglejszewski studied philosophy and theology in his home town.

Zglejszewski moved to the United States in 1987 and finished his studies for the priesthood at the Seminary of the Immaculate Conception in Huntington, New York.

=== Ordination and ministry ===
Zglejszewski was ordained a priest for the Diocese of Rockville Centre by Bishop John R. McGann on May 26, 1990, at Cathedral of Saint Agnes in Rockville Centre. Zglejszewski later studied sacramental theology at the Catholic University of America in Washington, D.C., and theology at Fordham University in New York City.

After his 1990 ordination, the diocese in 1991 assigned Zglejszewski as associate pastor at St. Christopher Parish in Baldwin, New York. He was transferred in 1995 to serve as associate pastor at St. Thomas the Apostle Parish in West Hempstead, New York.After working at St. Thomas for seven years, Zglejszewski in 2002 was appointed associate pastor at St. Rose of Lima Parish in Massapequa, New York.

Zglejszewski left St. Rose in 2007 after Bishop William F. Murphy appointed him as director of the Office of Worship for the diocese and as the co-chancellor. Zglejszewski also served as an adjunct professor teaching in the diaconate formation program at Immaculate Conception Seminary.

=== Auxiliary Bishop of Rockville Centre ===
Pope Francis named Zglejszewski the titular bishop of Nicives and an auxiliary bishop of Rockville Centre on February 11, 2014. He was consecrated in St. Agnes Cathedral on March 25, 2014, by Bishop William Murphy. Bishop Robert E. Guglielmone and Auxiliary Bishop Robert J. Brennan were the principal co-consecrators.

== See also ==
- Catholic Church hierarchy
- Catholic Church in the United States
- Historical list of the Catholic bishops of the United States
- List of Catholic bishops of the United States
- Lists of patriarchs, archbishops, and bishops

== Episcopal succession ==
Catholic Church titles
Preceded by –	Auxiliary Bishop of Rockville Centre; 2014–present	Succeeded by –
