= Luis Miguel Romero Fernández =

His Excellency, The Most Reverend Luis Miguel Romero Fernández M.Id
- Auxiliary Bishop of Rockville Centre; Titular Bishop of Egara
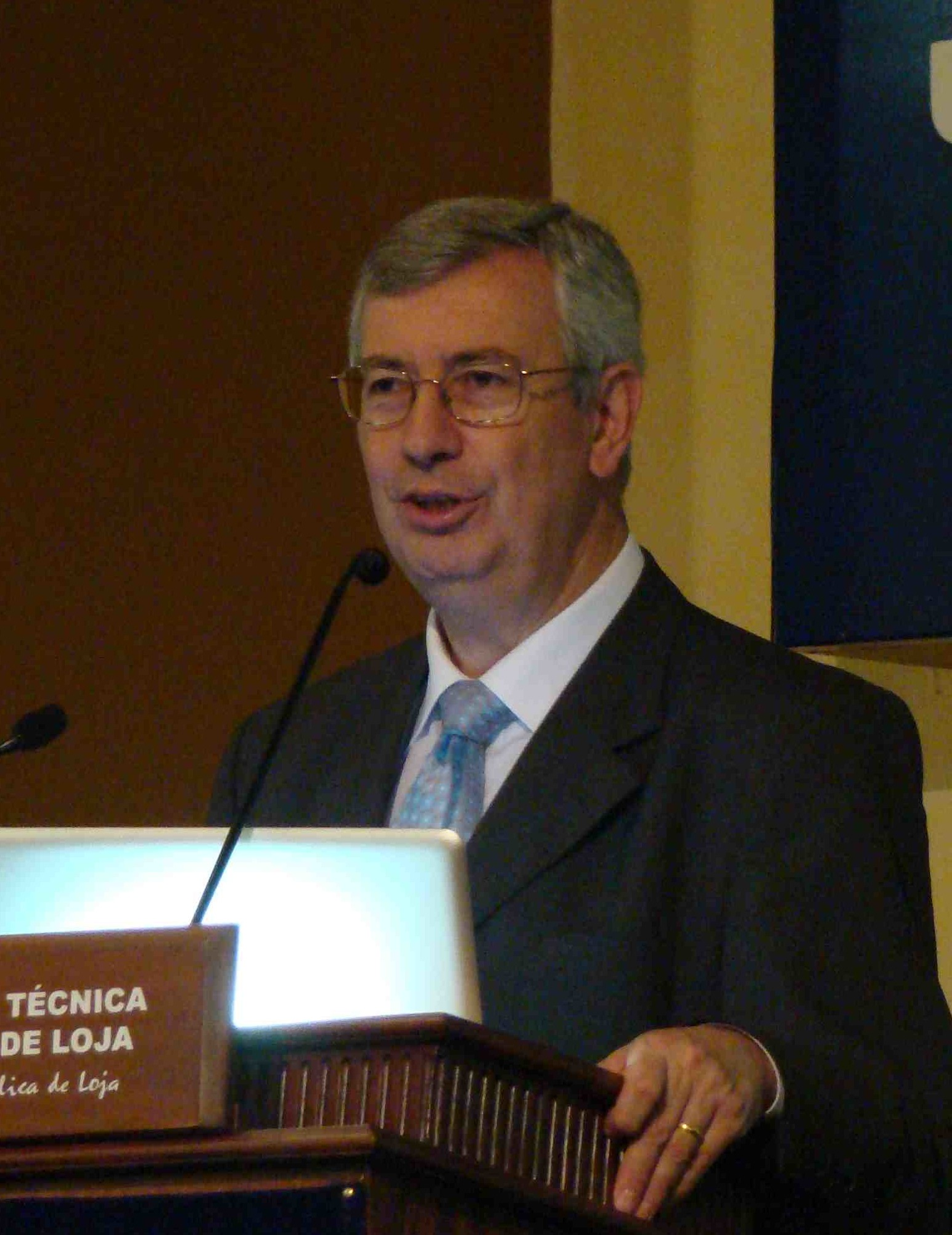
- Romero in 2009
- Archdiocese: New York
- Diocese: Rockville Centre
- Appointed: March 3, 2020
- Installed: June 29, 2020
- Other post: Titular Bishop of Egara

Orders
- Ordination: September 11, 1981 by Paul Karatas
- Consecration: June 29, 2020 by John Barres, William Murphy, and Robert J. Brennan

Personal details
- Born: June 16, 1954 (age 72) Palencia, Spain
- Education: University of Zaragoza
- Motto: Meek and humble of heart

Styles of Luis Miguel Romero Fernández
- Reference style: His Excellency; The Most Reverend
- Spoken style: Your Excellency
- Religious style: Bishop

Luis Miguel Romero Fernández M.Id, (born June 16, 1954) is a Spanish-born prelate of the Roman Catholic Church who has been serving as an auxiliary bishop for the Diocese of Rockville Centre in New York since 2020.

== Biography ==
=== Early life ===
Luis Romero was born on June 16, 1954, in Palencia, Spain, Spain, and raised in Huelva, Spain. He entered the Idente Missionaries in 1972.

=== Priesthood ===
Romero was ordained to the priesthood in Tenerife, Spain, by Archbishop Paul Karatas for the Indente Missionaries Order on September 11, 1981. He received a doctorate in medicine from the University of Zaragoza in Zaragoza, Spain, in 1987.

Romero worked for 25 years in Latin America, including a stint from 1996 to 2009 as chancellor and rector-chancellor of the Universidad Técnica Particular de Loja in San Cayetano Alto, Ecuador. In 2007, Romero was named president of the Organización Universitaria Interamericana (Inter-American Organization for Higher Education). In December 2019, Romero was named vicar of Hispanic ministry for the Diocese of Rockville Centre.

=== Auxiliary Bishop of Rockville Centre ===
Pope Francis appointed Romero as auxiliary bishop of Rockville Centre and titular bishop of Egara on March 3, 2020. His consecration as bishop, initially scheduled for April 16, 2020, was postponed due to the COVID-19 pandemic. He was consecrated as a bishop by Bishop John Barres on June 29, 2020 at St. Agnes Cathedral in Rockville Centre.

== See also ==
- Catholic Church hierarchy
- Catholic Church in the United States
- Historical list of the Catholic bishops of the United States
- List of Catholic bishops of the United States
- Lists of patriarchs, archbishops, and bishops
