= Robert J. Coyle =

American Roman Catholic priest and bishop

His Excellency, The Most Reverend Robert Joseph Coyle
- Auxiliary Bishop of Rockville Centre; Titular Bishop of Zabi
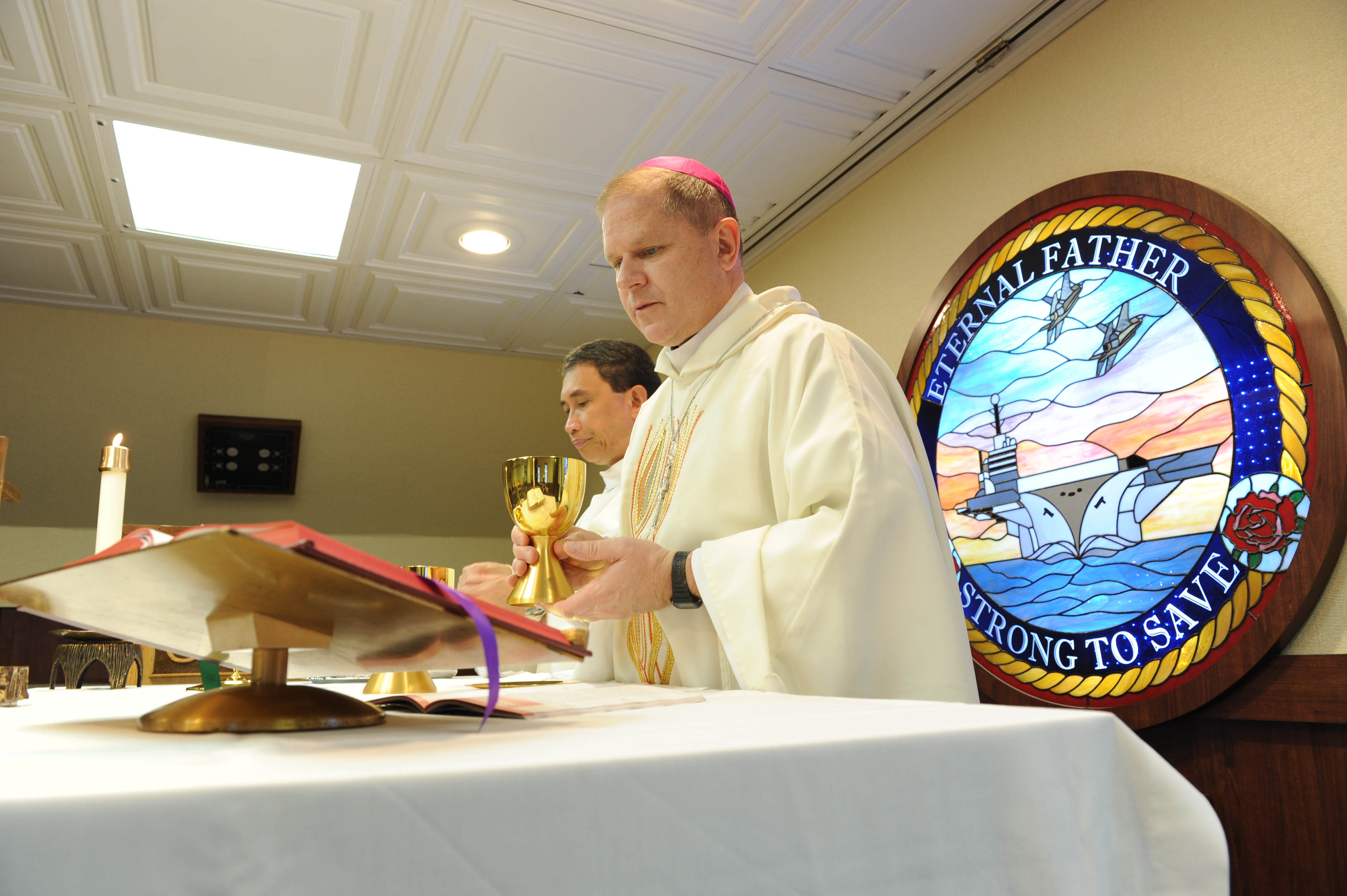
- Bishop Coyle celebrating mass aboard the aircraft carrier USS Theodore Roosevelt
- Archdiocese: New York
- Diocese: Rockville Centre
- Appointed: February 20, 2018
- Installed: April 2, 2018
- Other post: Titular Bishop of Zabi
- Previous post: Auxiliary Bishop for the Military Services, USA

Orders
- Ordination: May 25, 1991 by John R. McGann
- Consecration: April 25, 2013 by Timothy Broglio, William Murphy, and Robert E. Guglielmone

Personal details
- Born: September 23, 1964 (age 62) Brooklyn, New York, US
- Denomination: Roman Catholic
- Education: Fordham University; Seminary of the Immaculate Conception
- Motto: Lord bid me come to you

Styles of Robert Joseph Coyle
- Reference style: His Excellency; The Most Reverend
- Spoken style: Your Excellency
- Religious style: Bishop

Robert Joseph Coyle (born September 23, 1964) is an American prelate of the Roman Catholic Church who has been serving as auxiliary bishop of the Diocese of Rockville Centre in New York since 2018. He previously served as an auxiliary bishop of the Archdiocese for the Military Services, USA in Washington D.C. from 2013 to 2018

== Biography ==
=== Early life ===
Robert Coyle was born on September 23, 1964, in Brooklyn, New York to Robert and Kathryn Coyle. Robert Coyle attended Saint Edward the Confessor Elementary School, in Syosset, New York. In 1982, he completed high school at Saint Mary’s Boys High School in Manhasset, New York.

Coyle then entered Fordham University in New York City, where he received a Bachelor of Arts degree in economics in 1986. Coyle then enlisted in the US Navy, where he was commissioned an ensign on June 3, 1988. He left the Navy in 1991, but remained in the US Naval Reserve. That same year, deciding to become a priest, Coyle entered Seminary of the Immaculate Conception in Huntington, New York, receiving a Master of Divinity degree in 1991.

=== Priest and US Navy chaplain ===
Coyle was ordained a priest at Saint Agnes Cathedral in Rockville on May 25, 1991, for the Diocese of Rockville Centre by John R. McGann. After his 1991 ordination, the diocese assigned Coyle as associate pastor at Saint Dominic Church in Oyster Bay, New York. Five years later, in 1996, the diocese transferred him to serve as associate pastor at Saint Patrick’s Church in Glen Cove, New York.

The Navy called Coyle to active duty in the US Navy Chaplain Corps in 1999. Over the next ten years, Coyle had the following postings in the Navy:

- Third Marine Division on Okinawa, Japan. He was promoted to lieutenant commander and deployed to Southeast Asia as a landing force chaplain (1999 to 2000).
- Aircraft carrier USS Harry S. Truman (CVN 75). Deployed to the Middle East from 2000 to 2001, served in Operation Southern Watch and Operation Iraqi Freedom from 2002 to 2003.
- U.S. Merchant Marine Academy in Kings Point, New York. Was assistant command chaplain before assuming duties as command chaplain. Promoted to rank of commander in 2005 (2003 to 2007).
- Aircraft carrier USS Dwight D. Eisenhower (CVN 69). Deployed to the Middle East in 2009 in support of Operation Enduring Freedom (2007 to 2009). The Vatican in 2008 elevated Coyle to the rank of chaplain to his holiness

Coyle left active duty in the Navy in 2009 to become pastor at Corpus Christi Parish in Mineola, New York. He retired from the Navy Reserve in January 2013.

=== Auxiliary Bishop for the Military Services, USA ===
On February 11, 2013, Coyle was named by Pope Benedict XVI as titular bishop of Zabi and auxiliary bishop of the Military Services, USA. He was consecrated at the National Shrine of the Immaculate Conception in Washington, D.C. by Archbishop Timothy Broglio on April 25, 2013, with Bishops William Murphy and Robert E. Guglielmone acting as co-consecrators.

=== Auxiliary Bishop of Rockville Centre ===
On February 20, 2018, Coyle was appointed by Pope Francis as auxiliary bishop of Rockville Centre; he was installed on April 2, 2018. On May 6, 2018, Coyle also became pastor of Good Shepherd Parish in Holbrook, New York.

== See also ==
- Catholic Church hierarchy
- Catholic Church in the United States
- Historical list of the Catholic bishops of the United States
- Insignia of chaplain schools in the United States military
- List of Catholic bishops of the United States
- List of Catholic bishops of the United States: military service
- Lists of patriarchs, archbishops, and bishops
- Military chaplain
- Religious symbolism in the United States military
- United States military chaplains
