= Good Samaritan University Hospital =

Teaching Hospital in New York, United States

- Catholic Health

Geography
- Location: 1000 Montauk Highway, West Islip, long island, New York, United States
- Coordinates: 40°41′46.2″N 73°17′40.5″W

Organization
- Care system: Catholic Health
- Type: Teaching
- Affiliated university: New York Institute of Technology College of Osteopathic Medicine
- Patron: Roman Catholic Diocese of Rockville Centre
- Network: Catholic Health Services of Long Island

Services
- Emergency department: Level I Adult Trauma Center / Level II Pediatric Trauma Center
- Beds: 437 + 100 nursing home beds

History
- Founded: May 1959

Links
- Website: goodsamaritan.chsli.org
- Lists: Hospitals in New York State

Good Samaritan University Hospital (formerly Good Samaritan Hospital Medical Center) is a 537-bed non-profit teaching hospital on Long Island located in West Islip, New York. The hospital contains 100 nursing home beds as well as operates an adult Level I trauma center and a pediatric Level II trauma center. Good Samaritan University Hospital opened in May 1959, and has expanded several times since opening. It has been Magnet-designed for its quality nursing since 2006, and is a member of Catholic Health. The hospital is also a major regional clinical campus for clinical clerkships and postgraduate medical training affiliated with the New York Institute of Technology College of Osteopathic Medicine, one of the largest medical schools in the United States.

== History ==
Good Samaritan University Hospital was established by the Daughters of Wisdom. It opened on May 18, 1959, on a 60-acre parcel adjacent to the Great South Bay.

From 1963 to 1967, Robert Moses was the chairperson for the hospital's annual ball. On July 29, 1981, Robert Moses died at Good Samaritan at age 92.

It has undergone major expansions six times: to the east in 1966; to the south with the 120-bed Baxter Pavilion in 1970; to the west with two additional patient floors in 1973; to the north in 1983 with a five-story addition which included eight new operating rooms and new radiology and pediatric departments; and in 1996 with a four-story addition for the teaching, mammography, pathology and surgical programs.

The sixth expansion, begun in 1998, was a new two-story structure connected to the main building by a corridor. The Center for Emergency Medicine and Trauma, which was dedicated on April 22, 2001, encompasses the first floor. In 2020 a separate dedicated 7 bed pediatric emergency department was built next to the emergency room.

In February 1980, Good Samaritan acquired the former Sayville Nursing Home for elderly patients who could no longer live home alone. The structure at the corner of Elm and Candee Avenues was totally refurbished as the Good Samaritan Nursing Home with skilled nursing facilities for 100 patient-residents.

In 1992, the West Islip Breast Cancer Coalition asked Good Samaritan to open a breast cancer center, and in February 1994, Good Samaritan opened its Breast Health Center. It became Long Island's first comprehensive breast health center. According to The New York Times, the center offers mammography examinations, biopsies, surgeries, after care, counseling, a boutique, and support groups. In 1997, the Breast Health Center was one of four places in the United States that was conducting clinical trials for new filmless digital mammography technology.

In 1997, the Bishop John R. McGann of the Rockville Centre diocese dismissed the separate boards operating Good Samaritan University Hospital, St. Francis Hospital & Heart Center, Mercy Hospital, and St. Charles Hospital and Rehabilitation Center, and placed the four hospitals under the management of the newly created Catholic Health Services of Long Island in response in changes in the health care industry and in order to aid the poor and needy.

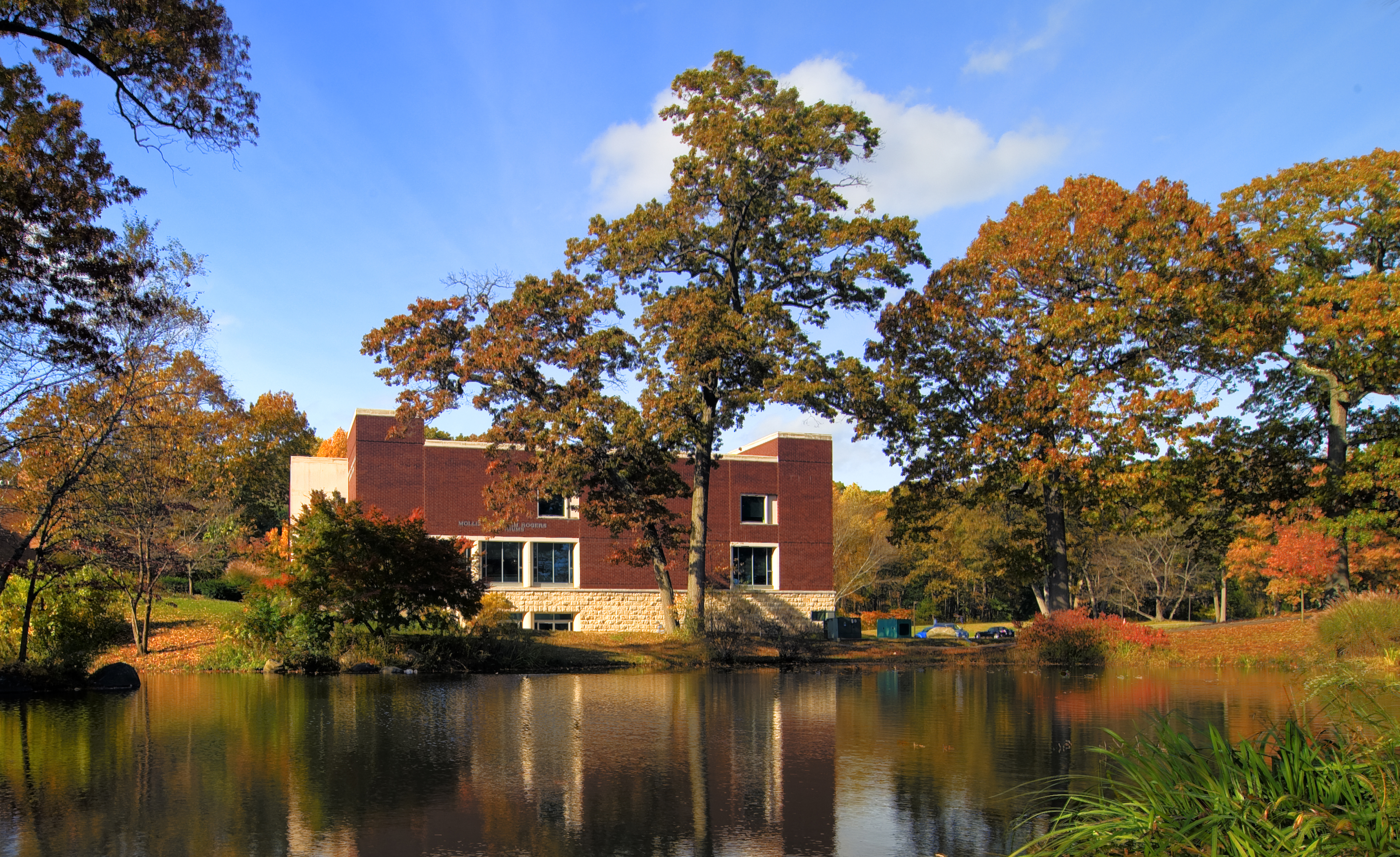
Good Samaritan University Hospital is affiliated with the New York Institute of Technology's College of Osteopathic Medicine.

In 2018, Catholic Health and Good Samaritan University Hospital entered into an agreement with the New York Institute of Technology College of Osteopathic Medicine to expand its number of seats for the college's osteopathic medical students to do medical rotations as well as pursue residencies and fellowships after students graduate. The agreement also offered expanded clerkship opportunities at all of Catholic Health Services' six hospitals.

In September 2022, Good Samaritan University Hospital announced and began building its 7th expansion, the Patient Care Pavilion to the far north. The 300,000-square-foot Patient Care Pavilion, which is set to be open in 2024, will host a brand new 78 bed adult enhanced emergency department, allowing the hospital to care for the over 80,000 patients who are admitted into the Emergency department each year. There will also be 16 new operating rooms as well as 2 Hybrid operating rooms. The new pavilion will also include a private medical surgical unit featuring 36 single patient rooms with the ability to renovate additional floors to increase the number of private rooms to 120.

The hospital was briefly shown in Netflix's Emergency NYC, episode 2. When an emergency pediatric transport team, had to transport a critically ill child suffering from a severe case of RSV to Cohen Children's Medical Center in New Hyde Park.

=== Investigation of Richard Angelo, "Angel of Death" ===
In 1987, American serial killer Richard Angelo was arrested following a urinalysis which showed elevated levels of Pavulon and Anectine. Later testing confirmed by Good Samaritan Hospital determined that Angelo's other victims were also positive for the same drugs. The hospital's investigations led to the subsequent charge of Angelo with multiple counts of second-degree murder and the killer's life sentence.

== Graduate medical education ==
Good Samaritan University Hospital operates a number of medical residency programs accredited by the Accreditation Council for Graduate Medical Education (ACGME) with osteopathic recognition. GSUH hosts residency programs in emergency medicine, family medicine, obstetrics & gynecology, pediatrics, physical medicine and rehabilitation, and podiatry. GSUH also operates fellowships in minimally-invasive gynecologic surgery, pediatric emergency medicine and ultrasonography. The hospital provides clinical rotations for medical students from the New York Institute of Technology College of Osteopathic Medicine.
