= Robert Coyle =

Robert Coyle may refer to:

- Robert Everett Coyle (1930–2012), American judge
- Robert J. Coyle (born 1964), Roman Catholic bishop
