= St. Francis Hospital (Flower Hill, New York) =

St. Francis Hospital & Heart Center
- Catholic Health
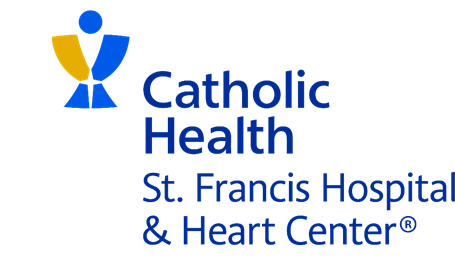

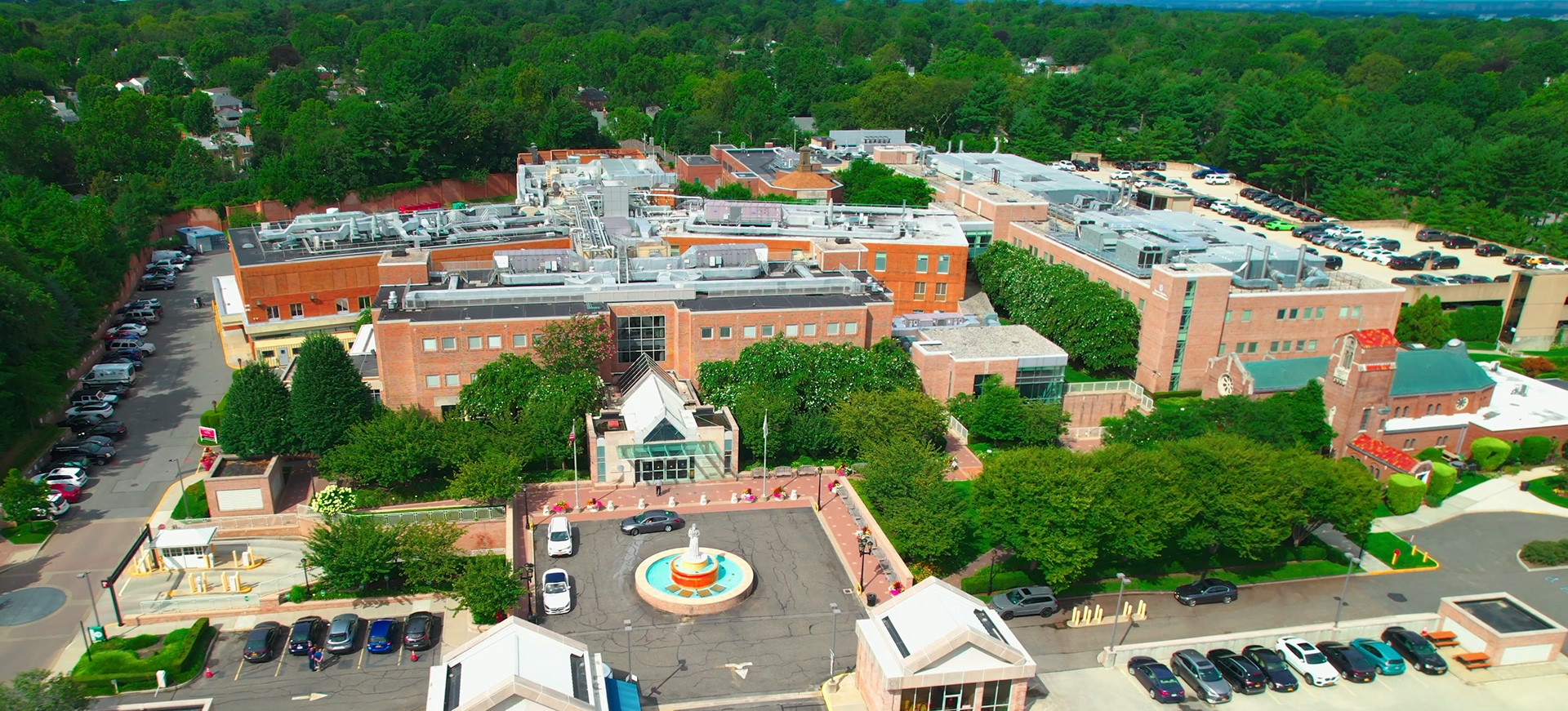
- Aerial view of campus

Geography
- Location: 100 Port Washington Boulevard; Roslyn, New York 11576; Flower Hill, New York, United States
- Coordinates: 40.8042°N 73.6700°W

Organization
- Type: non academic

Services
- Emergency department: Yes
- Beds: 364

History
- Former names: St. Francis Home; St. Francis Sanatorium
- Founded: 1922

Links
- Website: chsli.org/st-francis-hospital
- Lists: Hospitals in New York State

St. Francis Hospital and Heart Center is a 364-bed non-profit teaching hospital located in Flower Hill, New York, United States. It is New York State's only specialty-designated cardiac center.

The hospital is affiliated with the New York Institute of Technology for clerkship education at the New York Institute of Technology College of Osteopathic Medicine.

== History ==
The origins of St. Francis Hospital & Heart Center can be traced back to 1922, when Carlos W. Munson, a wealthy Flower Hill resident and the heir to the Munson Steamship Company – along with his wife, Mabel, gave a 15-acre parcel of their property to the Franciscan Missionaries of Mary. The Franciscan Missionaries of Mary opened a convent on the land and used it as a camp for poor and chronically-ill children from New York City.

On May 8, 1935, Gloria Vanderbilt received her first communion at the convent located at St. Francis.

In 1937, two percent of Brooklyn schoolchildren suffered from rheumatic heart conditions and needed charitable healthcare assistance. As a result, the camp was transformed into a cardiac sanatorium for children. By 1941, St. Francis featured 125 beds, caring for children between 6 and 16 years of age with an average stay of 8 months. The hospital expanded in 1954 to care for adult patients and had grown to house 227 beds and 5 operating rooms by 1973.

In 1953, a new operating facility opened at St. Francis, designed by George Holdeness, of Eggers & Higgins.

Around 1957, Frederic P. Wiedersum Associates designed a reconstructed dormitory after it had been damaged in a fire; the firm also designed buildings at the hospital in the 1970s.

In December 1983, First Lady Nancy Reagan visited St. Francis Hospital after she and President Ronald Reagan brought two children, Ah Ji Sook (7) and Lee Kil Woo (4), from South Korea to the United States in November 1983 for open-heart surgery at St. Francis Hospital. Mrs. Reagan held a press conference at St. Francis Hospital that December 15th; the surgery saved the lives of both children.

In 1988, an acute care wing at St. Francis Hospital was dedicated to Nancy Reagan for saving the lives of the two children in 1983. Reagan attended the Nancy Reagan Hall's dedication ceremony and opening in October 4, 1988.

In 2012, St. Francis Hospital renovated their emergency room, expanding it and making it more energy-efficient.

== Rankings and recognition ==
St. Francis Hospital & Heart Center is nationally ranked in 8 adult specialties and high performing in 19 procedures/conditions according to U.S. News and World Report. It is also regionally ranked and tied as the #5 best hospital in New York.

2026-2027 U.S. News & World Report Quality Rankings & Ratings for St. Francis Hospital & Heart Center
Speciality	Rank (In the U.S.)
Cardiology, Heart & Vascular Surgery	#18
Diabetes & Endocrinology	#35
Gastroenterology & GI Surgery	#33
Geriatrics	#31
Neurology & Neurosurgery	#47
Orthopedics	#43
Pulmonology & Lung Surgery	#40
Urology	#23

In 2025, The American Nurses Credentialing Center awarded St. Francis with Magnet status, the highest recognition for excellence in professional nursing in the nation.

== Notable staff ==
- David B. Samadi – Urologist; director of men's health.

== Notable patients ==
- James D. Robinson III - died March 18, 2024, aged 88, in Roslyn, New York, from respritory failure, caused by pneumonia.
- After Avianca Flight 52 crashed on January 25, 1990 in Cove Neck, St. Francis Hospital was one of several area hospitals that took in and provided care to passengers injured in the crash. The crash victims taken in by St. Francis Hospital included both adults and children.
- Elsie Eaves – Pioneering female civil engineer; died at St. Francis in 1983.
- Lewis Henry Haney – Economist; died from a stroke at St. Francis in 1969.
- Milton Hopkins – American biologist, historian, and textbook editor; died at St. Francis Hospital in 1983.
- Alfred A. Lama – Italian-American architect and politician known for his sponsoring of New York state's Mitchell–Lama Housing Program; died at St. Francis Hospital in 1984.
- Joseph M. Margiotta – Major New York politician and political boss who formerly ran the Nassau County GOP; died at St. Francis Hospital in 2008.
- John Slate – Aviation lawyer; died at St. Francis Hospital in 1967.

== Transportation ==
St. Francis Hospital is served by the n23 bus route, which is operated by Nassau Inter-County Express (NICE). The n23 stops directly in front of the hospital's main entrance, on Port Washington Boulevard (NY 101).

== See also ==
- Saint Catherine of Siena Medical Center – Another Catholic Health Services of Long Island hospital, located in Smithtown.
- North Shore University Hospital – Another nearby hospital, located in Manhasset and operated by Northwell Health.
- NYU Langone Hospital – Long Island – Another nearby hospital, located in Mineola and operated by NYU Langone Health.
- Roman Catholic Diocese of Rockville Centre
