= Kellenberg Memorial High School =

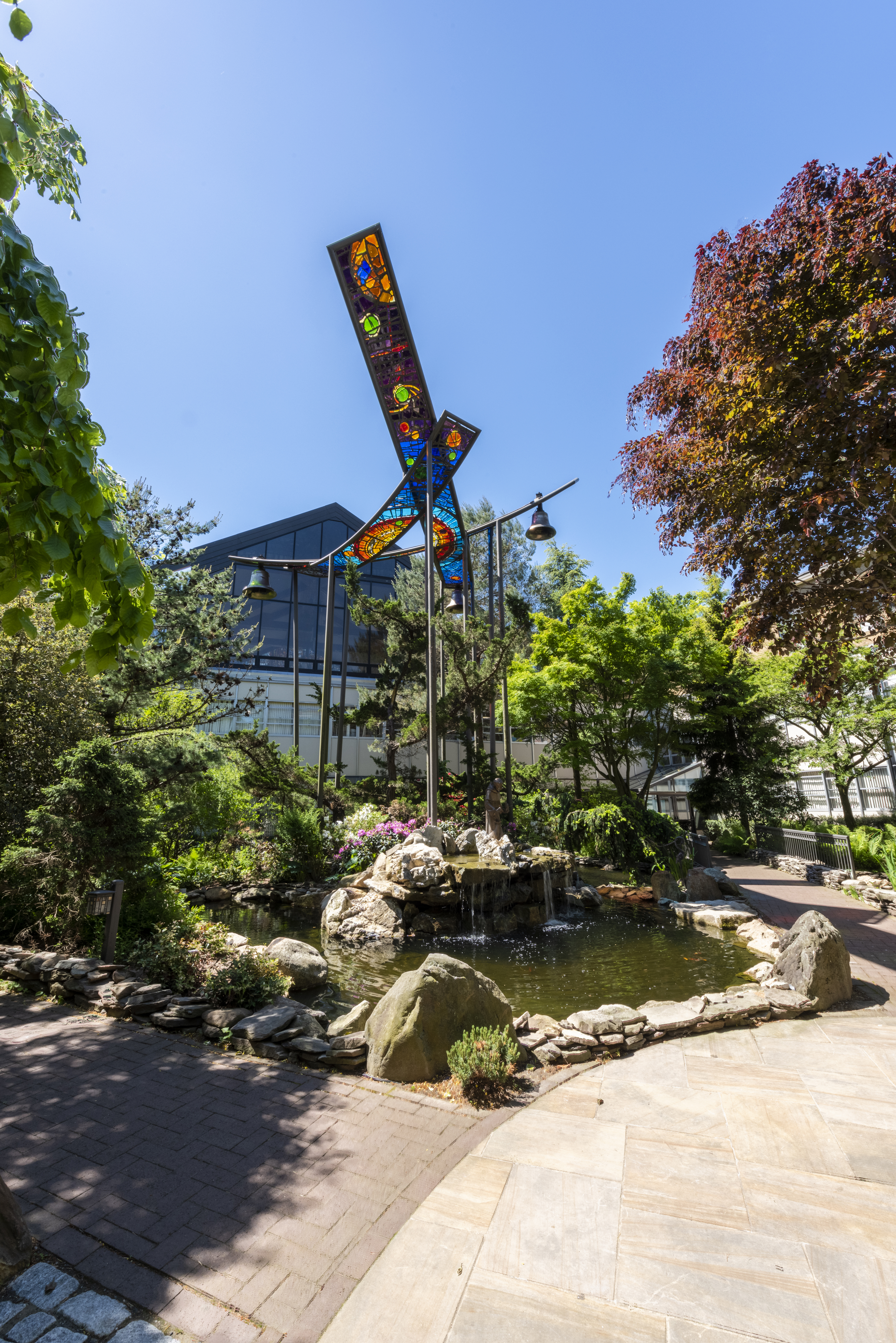
- Madonna Pavilion at Kellenberg Memorial High School

Location
- 1400 Glenn Curtiss Boulevard; Uniondale, Nassau, New York 11553; United States; 40°42′55″N 73°34′56″W

Information
- Type: Independent Catholic school, coeducational
- Motto: One Heart, One Mind
- Religious affiliations: Roman Catholic; Marianist
- Established: 1987
- Founder: Society of Mary
- Status: Open
- Oversight: University of the State of New York
- CEEB code: 334880
- Dean: Jennifer Mulligan, John McCutcheon
- Principal: Kenneth M. Hoagland, S.M.
- Chaplain: Fr. Thomas A. Cardone, S.M.
- Teaching staff: 137.4 (on an FTE basis)
- Grades: 6–12
- Enrollment: 2618 (2017–2018)
  - Latin School: 535 (Grades 6–8, enrollment included in total)
- Average class size: approx. 35
- Student to teacher ratio: 19.1
- Campuses: Uniondale, NY; 20 acres (8.1 ha)
- Colors: Blue and gold
- Athletics conference: CHSAA
- Mascot: Fuego the Firebird, Iggy the Firebird (Latin School)
- Team name: Firebirds
- Accreditation: Middle States Association of Colleges and Schools
- Publication: The Renaissance (literary magazine) "Heart and Mind" (bi-annual magazine)
- Newspaper: The Phoenix; The Early Bird (Latin School)
- Yearbook: Blue & Gold
- Tuition: $14,000 (Grades 9–12, 2024-2025); 14,000 (Grades 6–8, 2024-2025)
- Communities served: Nassau, Queens and Suffolk Counties
- Feeder schools: Joseph C. Fox Latin School; St. Martin de Porres Marianist School
- Website: www.kellenberg.org

Kellenberg Memorial High School is a Roman Catholic college-preparatory school in Uniondale, New York. It is one of three Marianist schools on Long Island, alongside St. Martin de Porres Marianist School (in Uniondale) and Chaminade High School (in Mineola).

== History ==
Kellenberg Memorial High School is named in honor of Most Rev. Walter P. Kellenberg, founding Bishop of the Diocese of Rockville Centre. In the 1960s, Kellenberg commissioned the construction of four diocesan high schools, including Maria Regina in Uniondale. Due to declining enrollment and a lack of low-cost priests and nuns to teach in these schools, Bishop McGann closed Maria Regina, but in the face of parental protests, the school was acquired by the Marianist brothers who were already running Chaminade High School in nearby Mineola, and was reopened as Kellenberg Memorial in 1987.

In September, 1987, the administration of Kellenberg Memorial High School announced the establishment of the Bro. Joseph C. Fox Latin School. The Latin School is named in honor of Marianist brother Bro. Joseph C. Fox, who taught for over fifty years in Catholic schools. This new division of KMHS provides a qualitative Catholic education to students from the public schools in grades six through eight.

== Campus ==
Kellenberg is accessed through the main entrance across from RXR Plaza on Glenn Curtiss Blvd. Although the lobby was originally designed as the main entrance, the school is oriented toward its north entrance, which features a mural of the Holy Family designed by artist Yan Rieger in 1997 in honor of the school's tenth anniversary. The mural includes a depiction of Jesus in his youth standing alongside Saint Joseph and the Virgin Mary. Students and Marianists assisted the artist and his wife with the execution of the mural.

Kellenberg Memorial has five athletic fields, four of which are named after the Four Evangelists. The fields are used for baseball, football, softball, and other sports. The school is also the caretaker of two Nassau County properties, one of which is located east of the school and one located west, which are also used for athletics. These properties are named Jerusalem and Jericho, after the two biblical cities. An artificial turf field was installed during the summer of 2010. This marks a series of campus improvements and expansions that was to take place throughout 2010 and 2011.

Kellenberg's campus features three courtyards and four chapels. The main courtyard is located in the center of the building and contains a koi river, four bridges, and a central bell tower. Many interior classrooms overlook this courtyard, and students are permitted to pass through the courtyard between classes.

== Academics ==
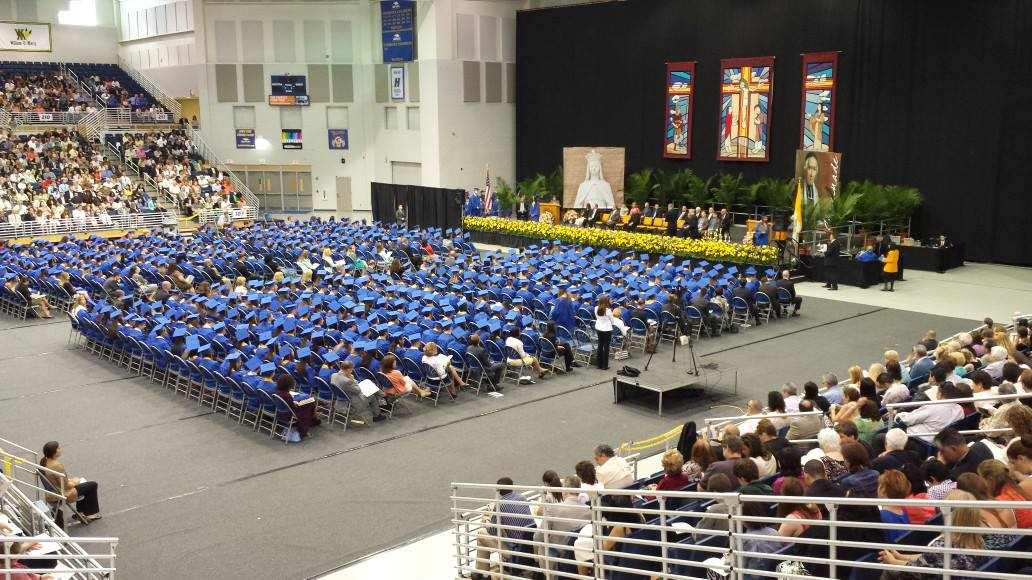
2013 Kellenberg Memorial High School graduation, held at Hofstra University's Hofstra Arena

Kellenberg Memorial High School offers a rigorous college preparatory curriculum. Core liberal arts courses are supplemented with required courses in health, computer technology, music, and art, among others. Students in the Latin School are required to take Latin.

Admission to the school is highly competitive, with many applicants enrolling in private exam preparation courses for the Catholic High School Entrance Exam (CHSEE/TACHS) in general and Kellenberg in particular.

== Latin School ==
The school also operates the Brother Joseph C. Fox Latin School on the same campus as the high school. Serving students from grades 6 through 8, it was originally designed for students who started in public school but wished to transfer into the Catholic school system; it now accepts students from both public and Catholic elementary schools.

Admission to the program is highly competitive, with many applying over a year in advance. The nature of the program allows middle school students to take courses taught by high school teachers (often with high school material) and to take part in clubs, activities and services that would normally not be available at a regular middle school. Students in grades 7 and 8 are required to take Latin, with those who remain at Kellenberg for high school placed in accelerated classes. Students who graduate from the program are guaranteed admission to the high school; however, they are required to take the CHSEE for statistical and quality-assurance purposes.

While the Latin School has a separate administration for academics, guidance and discipline, the schools are otherwise administered as one unit, sharing facilities and faculty. Most clubs and activities are run as one unit for grades 6–12. The administration of the Latin School is subsidiary to that of the greater school, with the Assistant Principal for the Latin School answerable to the Principal and President of Kellenberg Memorial High School.

== Faculty ==
As of April 2010, the faculty included 130 members, including three Marianist Priests and 12 Marianist Brothers. Many school administrators maintain teaching roles in the school. There is also a large school staff body consisting of about 70 members. Many members of the Society of Mary have canine companions that often follow them to the classroom or reside in their offices during the day, sometimes cited as a very likable trait of the school. Many of the faculty and school staff are alumni.

Administrators have contributed articles to a diverse range of publications, from the religious Catalyst to the mainstream New York Times. Current faculty include college faculty, published authors and professional musicians. Former faculty members contributed to works still included in the school's curriculum, from history classes to faith-based clubs. Music produced by student organizations is sold at online music retailers.

== Co-curricular and extracurricular activities ==
In the Marianist tradition, many students join sodality groups to mutually reinforce their Catholic faith. The groups meet weekly and participate in various religious activities. The school also operates Emmanuel, a Marianist Retreat House devoted to students' spiritual formation.

A major co-curricular focus is music. Activities in this area include Band (four levels), Chorus (four levels), Guitar Club, Jazz Band, the Firebird Swing Jazz Choir, Orchestra, Pit Band, and Jubilee Choir, Gregorian Consortium (sometimes called St. Greg's).

Publications include Blue and Gold (a yearbook), The Renaissance (a literary magazine), The Phoenix (a newspaper), and the Blue Blazer Newsletter (a digital newspaper).

Kellenberg also has an Academic Quiz Bowl team and a Science Olympiad team. The Academic Quiz Bowl team came in 11th place at the 2008 NAQT High School National Championship, and placed second in the 2010 season of the New York area TV show The Challenge. The team won the 2009 New York State NAQT tournament, placing first in the state with the JV team in fifth; at the state level, three of the top five players came from Kellenberg teams. The Science Olympiad team has qualified for the New York State Science Olympiad Competition several times in recent years.

A major activity for female students at Kellenberg is the annual Blue and Gold show. Students who participate are divided into two teams, a blue team and a gold team. The girls practice from February until May. The competition takes place on one night in May, and attracts a widespread Long Island audience.

In 2006, the school received national attention when the principal, Kenneth Hoagland, canceled the Senior Prom. In a letter from late March 2006, he cited "booze cruises" sponsored by parents, cocktail parties, and the film American Pie as examples of "adolescent culture being formed and led by the media". The school received national attention from ABC, CNN, Fox News, MTV, The New York Times, and Comedy Central's The Colbert Report.

In 2018, the school reestablished the varsity ice hockey program, as well as established a varsity crew program for both boys and girls. In 2019, a junior varsity ice hockey team was added.

== Notable alumni ==
- Donatella Arpaia 1989 – restaurateur; television personality who appears on The Food Network
- Jon Harris 1992 - 1st round draft pick #25 for the NFL's Philadelphia Eagles
- Karine Jean-Pierre 1993 – White House Press Secretary (2022-2025)
- Marc Forgione 1996 – chef and owner of restaurant Marc Forgione; competed on The Next Iron Chef in 2010 and won; an Iron Chef on Iron Chef America
- Reid Gorecki 1999 – outfielder for Major League Baseball's Atlanta Braves
- Jason Michael Brescia 2004 – film director and writer
- Kevin McCarthy 2010 – pitcher for the Kansas City Royals
- Matthew Sluka 2018 – College Quarterback for James Madison Dukes football
