= St. Pius X Preparatory Seminary =

Former minor seminary

- Type: Minor Seminary
- Active: 1961–1984
- Religious affiliation: Catholic Church
- Location: 1220 Front Street, Uniondale, New York, United States; 40.70979°N 73.58433°W

St. Pius X Preparatory Seminary was the minor seminary of the Diocese of Rockville Centre. It was founded in 1961 and closed in 1984.

It was originally headquartered in Hempstead, New York, but moved to its permanent home on Front Street in Uniondale, New York in the early 1960s. At that time, it served as both a high school seminary and a two-year junior college. After the establishment of Cathedral College of the Immaculate Conception, the junior college portion closed in 1968. St. Pius X's high school was closed in 1984.

== Notable alumni ==
- Joe Donnelly, United States Ambassador to the Holy See (2022-2024), Democrat of Indiana, U.S. Senate (2013- 2018), U.S. House of Representatives (2007-2013)
- Sean Hannity, media personality, host of “Hannity” on Fox News Channel
- Kevin McCormack, Deacon, Co-Host of WABC (AM)'s Religion on the Line Sunday morning broadcast
- Peter Jurasik, film and television Actor, celebrated for the role of Londo Mollari on Babylon 5.
- Stephen O'Mara, Tenor in the U.S. and Europe mentored by Beverly Sills, credits included performing with the Metropolitan Opera.

== See also ==
- List of defunct colleges and universities in New York
