= Gerald Augustine John Ryan =

American Roman Catholic bishop (1923–1985)

- Auxiliary Bishop of Rockville Centre
- In office: 1977-1985

Orders
- Ordination: June 3, 1950
- Consecration: May 9, 1977

Personal details
- Born: August 23, 1923 Brooklyn, New York
- Died: June 4, 1985 (aged 61)
- Denomination: Roman Catholic

Gerald Augustine John Ryan (August 23, 1923 – June 4, 1985) was an American prelate of the Catholic Church who served as Auxiliary bishop of the Diocese of Rockville Centre, New York from 1977 to 1985.

== Biography ==
Born in Brooklyn, New York, Ryan was ordained a priest for the Roman Catholic Diocese of Brooklyn on June 3, 1950.

On February 28, 1977, Ryan was named titular bishop of Munatiania and auxiliary bishop of the Roman Catholic Diocese of Rockville Centre and was consecrated on May 9, 1977.

Bishop Ryan died while still in office.

== Notes ==
Catholic Church titles
Preceded by –	Auxiliary Bishop of Rockville Centre; 1977–1985	Succeeded by –
