= Saint Catherine of Siena Medical Center =

St. Catherine of Siena Medical Center
- Catholic Health

Geography
- Location: 50 Route 25A, Smithtown, New York, United States
- Coordinates: 40°52′05″N 73°13′22″W

Organization
- Type: Teaching
- Affiliated university: New York Institute of Technology College of Osteopathic Medicine
- Patron: Diocese of Rockville Centre

Services
- Emergency department: Yes
- Beds: 296

History
- Founded: 1962 (as St John's Smithtown Hospital), 1999 (as St Catherine of Siena Medical Center)

Links
- Website: stcatherines.chsli.org, sienawomenshealth.org, stcatherinenursingandrehab.chsli.org
- Lists: Hospitals in New York State

St. Catherine of Siena Medical Center is a 296-bed, not-for-profit hospital located on Long Island in Smithtown, New York. The hospital opened in 1962 as St. John's Smithtown Hospital and its name was changed to its present in 1999. It is a major regional clinical campus for clinical clerkships and postgraduate medical training affiliated with the New York Institute of Technology College of Osteopathic Medicine, one of the largest medical schools in the United States. Since 2000, the hospital has been operated by Catholic Health.

== History ==
Construction of the hospital began in 1962 on a 74-acre plot of land on the outskirts of Smithtown, Long Island, New York. It was opened in 1962 as St. John's Smithtown Hospital, a not-for-profit hospital operated by the Church Charity Foundation of Long Island, an Episcopal (Anglican) organization.

At the time of its opening, the hospital had a total of 160 employees. By its fifth year of operation, it had grown to 357 full-time employees and 151 part-time, and had provided services to nearly 100,000 patients. A local Smithtown newspaper ran an article on the fifth anniversary of St. John's opening, celebrating the hospital's delivery of Suffolk County's millionth resident.

With various expansions, the hospital campus has grown to 110 acres, and now has 296 hospital beds and 240 nursing home beds. Expansions and additions to the hospital have included:

- A Psychiatric Unit in 1976
- Medical Office Building in 1989
- Cardiac Care Unit in 1990
- Nursing and Rehabilitation Care Center in 1990
- Dialysis Unit in 1993
- Oncology Unit in 1994
- Endoscopy Suite in 2002
- Siena Women's Health Pavilion in 2009
- Center for Hyperbaric Medicine and Wound Healing in 2015
- St. Catherine & St. Charles Health & Wellness Center in 2017

St. John's Smithtown Hospital was purchased by the Catholic Health Services of Long Island (now known as Catholic Health) on February 29, 2000, and renamed St. Catherine of Siena Medical Center after the 14th-century Catholic saint Catherine of Siena.

== Accreditation ==
St. Catherine of Siena Medical Center is accredited by the Joint Commission, having received the National Quality Approval Gold Seal and the Joint Commission's Top Performer Key. It has been designated a Breast Imaging Center of Excellence by the American College of Radiology.

== Awards ==
In June 2017, the Healthcare Association of New York State (HANYS) presented its 2017 Pinnacle Award for Quality and Patient Safety to St. Catherine of Siena Medical Center for outstanding initiatives that enhanced patient care. The hospital was awarded the GOLD PLUS Seal by the American Heart Association, and the American Stroke Association in 2016, designating them a member of the Stroke Honor Roll. In December 2016, Becker's Hospital Review listed the hospital as one of "49 Hospitals With the Lowest Heart Attack Mortality Rates." The hospital was one of 36 hospitals in the United States to receive the U.S. Department of Health and Human Services Outstanding Leadership Award for Achievements in Eliminating Ventilator-Associated Pneumonia in 2011.
