= Paul Henry Walsh =

American prelate

His Excellency Paul Henry Walsh
- Titular Bishop of Abthugni
- Church: Roman Catholic Church
- See: Titular See of Abthugni
- In office: 2003 - 2014
- Predecessor: Leonard Hsu Ying-fa
- Successor: Incumbent

Orders
- Ordination: June 9, 1966
- Consecration: May 29, 2003 by William Francis Murphy

Personal details
- Born: August 17, 1937 Brooklyn, New York
- Died: October 18, 2014 (aged 77)

Styles of Paul Henry Walsh
- Reference style: The Most Reverend
- Spoken style: Your Excellency
- Religious style: Monsignor
- Posthumous style: not applicable

Paul Henry Walsh (August 17, 1937 – October 18, 2014) was an American prelate of the Roman Catholic Church who served as Auxiliary bishop of the Diocese of Rockville Centre, New York, USA, from 2003 to 2012.

== Biography ==
Paul H. Walsh was born in Brooklyn, New York. He studied at the Dominican House of Studies in Washington D.C. Walsh was ordained a priest on June 9, 1966.

Walsh was appointed Titular Bishop of Abtugni and Auxiliary Bishop of Rockville Centre on April 3, 2003, by John Paul II. Paul Henry Walsh was consecrated an auxiliary bishop on May 29, 2003.

Pope Benedict XVI accepted Bishop Walsh's request for retirement as Auxiliary Bishop of Rockville Centre on August 12, 2012.

=== Life as a diocesan priest ===
Incardination Date - Diocese of Rockville Centre: 13 December 1984
Associate Pastor of Our Lady Queen of Martyrs, Centerport, New York (15 June 1983 - 15 June 1988)
Associate Pastor of Saint Patrick's, Smithtown, New York (16 June 1988 - 19 June 1990)
Pastor of Saint Patrick's, Smithtown, New York (20 June 1990 - 24 June 2003)
Pastor of Queen of the Most Holy Rosary, Roosevelt, New York (25 June 2003 - June 2009)
In Residence at Queen of the Most Holy Rosary, Roosevelt, New York (June 2009 - June 2010)
In Residence at Our Holy Redeemer, Freeport, New York (June 2010 - 18 October 2014)

== See also ==
- Roman Catholic Diocese of Rockville Centre

Catholic Church titles
Preceded by Leonard Hsu Ying-fa	Roman Catholic Titular See of Abthugni; 2003–2012	Succeeded by –
