= West Neck Road Historic District =

Historic district in New York, United States

- U.S. National Register of Historic Places
- U.S. Historic district
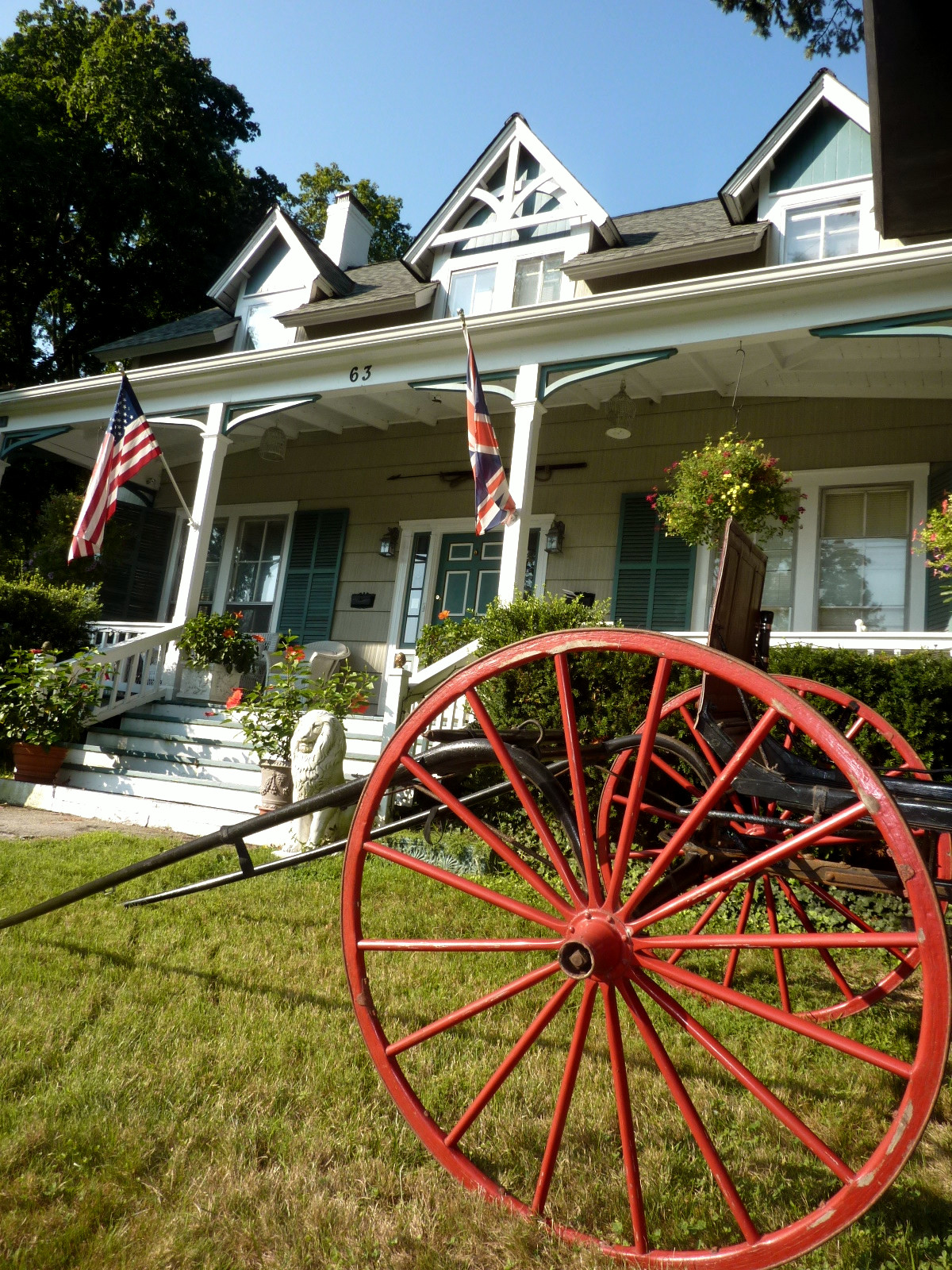
- A house in the West Neck Road Historic District.

- Location within New York Location within the United States
- Location: West Neck Road, Huntington, New York
- Coordinates: 40°52′22″N 73°25′58″W
- Area: 9 acres (3.6 ha)
- Architectural style: Late Victorian, Gothic Revival, Federal
- MPS: Huntington Town MRA
- NRHP reference No.: 85002567
- Added to NRHP: September 26, 1985

West Neck Road Historic District is a national historic district located at Huntington in Suffolk County, New York. The district has 26 contributing buildings. It is a large, intact residential enclave with dwellings dating from the mid-18th to early 20th centuries.

It was added to the National Register of Historic Places in 1985.
