= Walter P. Kellenberg =

American prelate

His Excellency, The Most Reverend Walter Philip Kellenberg
- Bishop of Rockville Centre; Titular Bishop of Ioannina
- Diocese: Rockville Centre
- In office: April 16, 1957 – May 3, 1976
- Successor: John R. McGann
- Previous posts: Bishop of Ogdensburg (1954–1957); Auxiliary Bishop of New York (1953–1954)

Orders
- Ordination: June 2, 1928 by Patrick Joseph Hayes
- Consecration: October 5, 1953 by James Francis McIntyre

Personal details
- Born: June 3, 1901 New York City, US
- Died: January 11, 1986 (aged 84) Rockville Centre, New York, US
- Denomination: Roman Catholic
- Motto: Regine verte lumina (Queen, guide me by thy light)
- Coat of arms

Walter Philip Kellenberg (June 3, 1901 – January 11, 1986) was an American prelate of the Roman Catholic Church who served as the first bishop of the Diocese of Rockville Centre on Long Island, New York, from 1957 to 1976.

Kellenberg previously served as bishop of the Diocese of Ogdensburg in Northern New York from 1954 to 1957 and as an auxiliary bishop of the Archdiocese of New York from later 1953 to early 1954.

== Biography ==
=== Early life ===
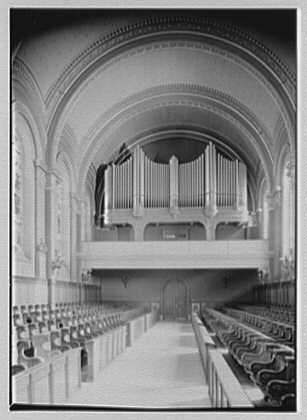
St. Joseph's Seminary, Yonkers, New York (1943)

Walter Kellenberg was born on June 3, 1901, in the Bronx, New York, to Conrad and Elizabeth (née Kern) Kellenberg. He had two brothers and two sisters. Walter Kellenberg received his early education at the parochial school of St. Anthony of Padua Parish in the Bronx. He then attended Fordham Preparatory School in the Bronx, graduating there in 1919. Deciding to become a priest, he then entered Cathedral College in Queens, New York.

Kellenberg continued his preparation for the priesthood at St. Joseph's Seminary in Yonkers, New York. He also took courses in real estate, insurance, and business administration at Columbia University in Manhattan.

=== Priesthood ===
Kellenberg was ordained to the priesthood for the Archdiocese of New York at St. Patrick's Cathedral in Manhattan on June 2, 1928 by Cardinal Patrick Hayes. After his 1928 ordination, the archdiocese assigned Kellenberg as curate at St. Mary's Parish in the Rosebank neighborhood of Staten Island, New York.

In 1934, he was transferred to St. Paul's Parish in Manhattan and appointed to the archdiocesan curia. Within a year, Kellenberg became a curate at St. Patrick's Cathedral Parish, and was named assistant chancellor and secretary of the archdiocesan Commission for Real Estate and Insurance in 1939.

Kellenberg became temporary administrator of St. John the Baptist Parish in Staten Island. and St. Nicholas Parish in Manhattan, and was named vice-chancellor in 1942. In 1943, the Vatican named Kellenberg as a papal chamberlain. Cardinal Francis Spellman in 1947 name him as his secretary and as chancellor of the archdiocese. The Vatican elevated Kellenberg to the rank of domestic prelate in 1948 and Spellman named him moderator of the coordinating committee of the Catholic Lay Organization in 1951.

=== Auxiliary Bishop of New York ===
On August 25, 1953, Kellenberg was appointed as an auxiliary bishop of New York and titular bishop of Ioannina by Pope Pius XII. He received his episcopal consecration on October 5, 1953 at St. Patrick's Cathedral from Cardinal James McIntyre, with Bishops William Scully and Joseph Flannelly serving as co-consecrators.

=== Bishop of Ogdensburg ===
Coat of arms as bishop of Ogdensburg

After only three months as auxiliary bishop in New York, Pius XII named Kellenberg as the sixth bishop of Ogdensburg on January 19, 1954. That same year, Kellenberg received an honorary Doctorate of Laws degree from Fordham University in the Bronx. In Ogdensburg, he, expanded the Departments of Education and Catechetics and opened new parochial schools. He also created catechism classes for Catholic students going to public schools and established a youth ministry. He also led Marian rallies and processions in the diocese.

=== Bishop of Rockville Centre ===
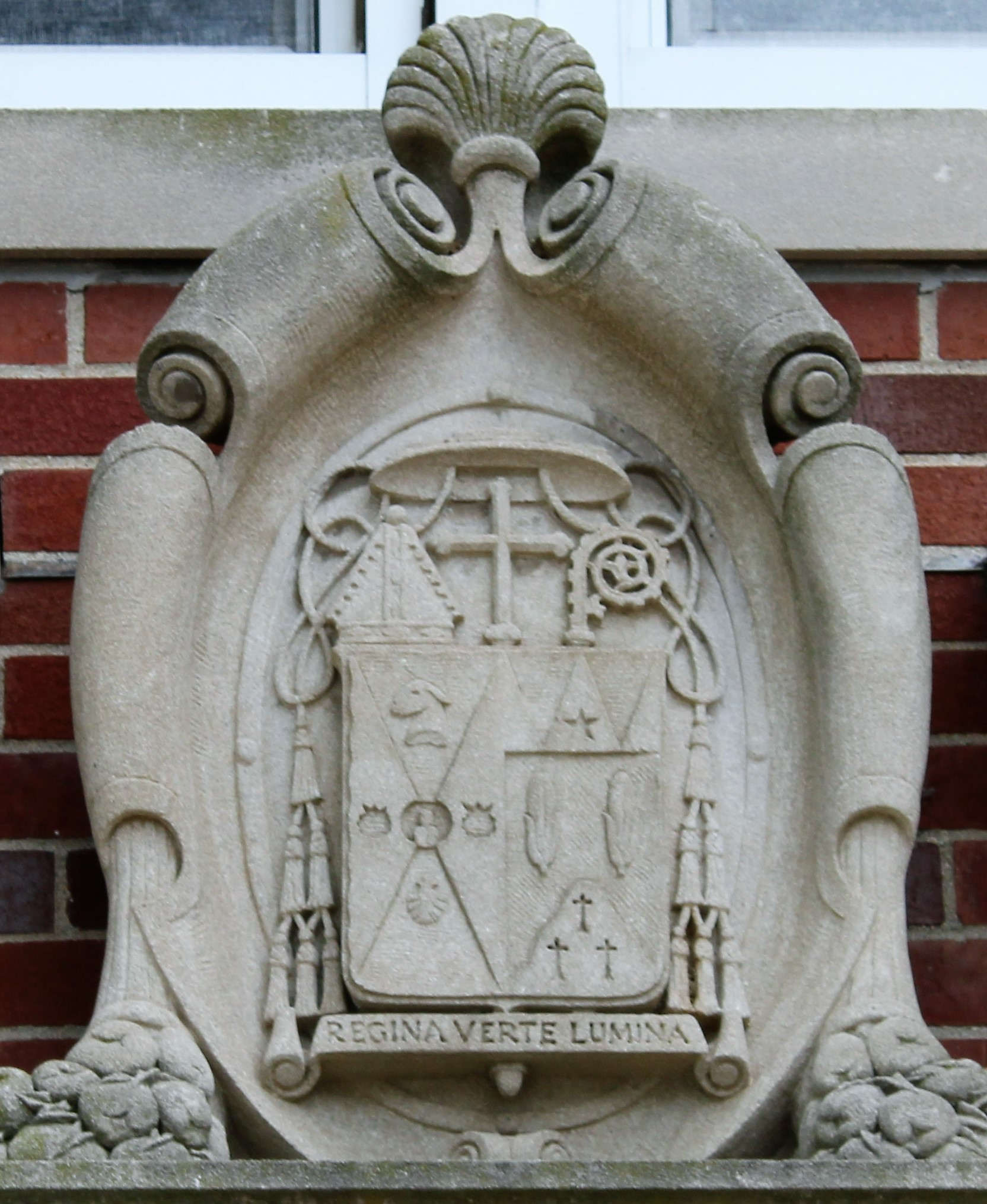
Bishop Kellenberg's coat of arms as bishop of Rockville Centre (2021)

Kellenberg remained in Ogdensburg for three years, until Pius XII appointed him as the first bishop of Rockville Centre on April 16, 1957. Kellenberg founded the diocesan chapter of Catholic Charities that same year.In 1958, Kellenberg dedicated the first permanent buildings for the Molloy College for Women in Rockville Centre. It is today Molloy University.

On April 12, 1959, at Mitchel Air Force Base in Long Island, New York, Kellenberg dedicated the medal of Our Lady of Loreto, the patron saint of air travelers and pilots. From 1962 to 1965, he attended all four sessions of the Second Vatican Council in Rome. Three colleges, eighteen high schools and a number of parish schools were established during his tenure in Rockville Centre.

=== Retirement and legacy ===
Shortly before reaching the mandatory retirement age of 75, Kellenberg resigned as bishop of Rockville Centre on May 3, 1976. Kellenberg died on January 11, 1986, from a cardiac arrest at Mercy Hospital in Rockville Centre at age 84.

- Kellenberg Memorial High School in Uniondale, New York is named in his honor.
- A stained glass window in St. Boniface Church in Elmont, New York depicts Pope John XXIII welcoming Kellenberg to the council.
- Kellenberg's coat of arms appears in the stained glass window of the formal lounge in Queen's Court on the Rose Hill Campus of Fordham University.
- The Hicksville Knights of Columbus Council 728 is named in honor of Kellenberg.

== Viewpoints ==
=== Discrimination ===
In 1963, Kellenberg called from greater understanding among people, saying it was a remedy for discrimination. He stated, "Only equal opportunity for all can make the American dream of justice a reality for our citizens."

Catholic Church titles
Preceded by First	Bishop of Rockville Centre; 1957–1976	Succeeded by John R. McGann
Preceded by Bryan Joseph McEntegart	Bishop of Ogdensburg; 1954–1957	Succeeded by James Johnston Navagh
Preceded by –	Auxiliary Bishop of New York; 1953–1954	Succeeded by –
