= Cathedral Preparatory School and Seminary =

All-male school and minor seminary in New York City

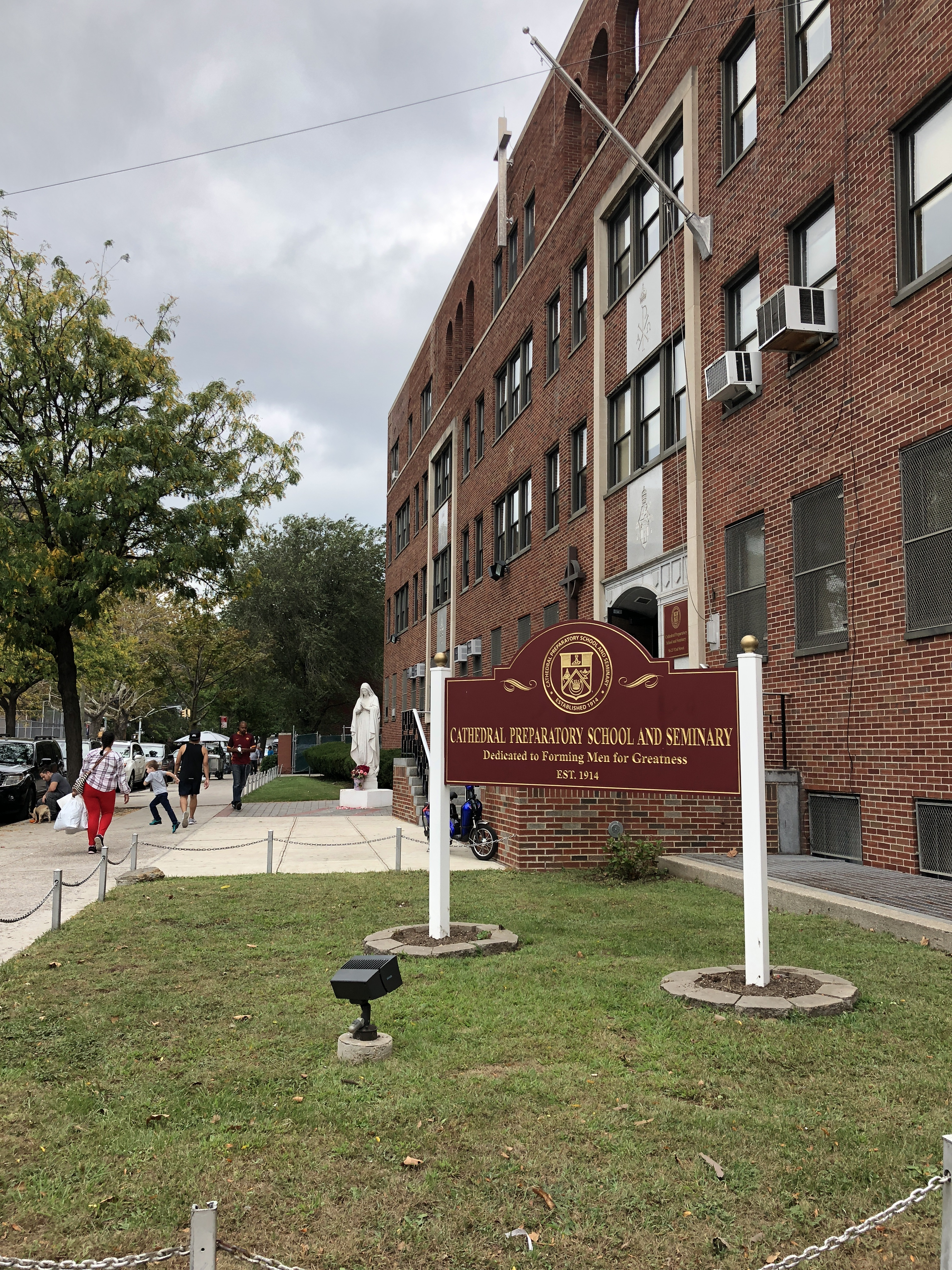

Location
- 56-25 92nd Street; New York City (Elmhurst, Queens), New York 11373; United States; 40°44′10″N 73°52′11″W

Information
- Type: School and Seminary, All-Male
- Motto: Ad Jesum Per Mariam (To Jesus Through Mary)
- Religious affiliation: Roman Catholic
- Oversight: Diocese of Brooklyn
- Principal: Richie Diaz
- Rector/President: James A. Kuroly
- Teaching staff: 15.0 (on an FTE basis)
- Grades: 9-12
- Enrollment: 160 (2019–2020)
- Student to teacher ratio: 10.7
- Colors: Navy Blue, Columbia Blue, White, and Black
- Song: Salve Regina
- Athletics conference: CHSAA Intersection A
- Sports: Baseball, Basketball, Bowling, Soccer, Cross Country, Outdoor Track
- Nickname: Crusaders
- Accreditation: Middle States Association of Colleges and Schools; Top 50 Catholic High Schools- National Catholic High School Honor Roll
- Publication: The Literary Journal
- Newspaper: The Current
- Yearbook: The Annual
- Tuition: $9,400
- Website: cathedralprep.org

Cathedral Preparatory School and Seminary is a Catholic high school and minor seminary in Elmhurst, Queens, New York City. It is operated by the Diocese of Brooklyn.

== History ==
=== Cathedral College ===
In early 1914, Charles E. McDonnell, bishop of the Diocese of Brooklyn, decided that the diocese needed a minor seminary (high school seminary) to ensure a supply of priests. He appointed then Monsignor George Mundelein as the first rector of Cathedral College of the Immaculate Conception. In September 1914, 110 students started classes in Cathedral College's temporary quarters at Saint John's Chapel in the Fort Greene section of Brooklyn. In December 1914, the diocese broke ground for the new campus in the Clinton Hill neighborhood in Brooklyn.

Cathedral College started operation as a six-year minor seminary, with a four-year high school track and a two-year college track. Upon completion of the six-year program, students continuing on to priesthood would be assigned to a major seminary. Many other students went on to become members of religious orders, lawyers, doctors and teachers.

=== Cathedral Preparatory Seminary ===
In 1963, Cathedral College opened a second location in Elmhurst; it was called Cathedral Preparatory Seminary. There were now two minor seminaries in the Diocese of Brooklyn. In 1967, Cathedral College of the Immaculate Conception converted to a four-year college seminary and moved to Douglaston, New York. The Queens and Brooklyn campuses of Cathedral Preparatory Seminary were separated from the college. Both campuses continued as four-year high school programs, operated by the Diocese of Brooklyn. The diocese closed the Brooklyn campus in 1985, leaving the Queens campus as the Cathedral Preparatory Seminary.

In 2002, the rector of Cathedral Prep, in Manhattan and not Brooklyn, Monsignor Charles M. Kavanagh, was accused of sexual abuse by a former seminarian at the school. The accuser, Daniel Donahue of Portland, Oregon claimed Kavanagh had made unwanted advances and touched him inappropriately in the 1980s, starting as an eighth grader at the seminary and continuing at Cathedral College. Donahue complained to the police and the diocese in 2002. Kavanagh denied all the charges. A review board from the Archdiocese of New York found him guilty in 2003. Kavanagh appealed the decision, but a tribunal from another diocese affirmed the decision. After another appeal, a second tribunal said Kavanagh was guilty and should be defrocked.

=== Cathedral Preparatory School and Seminary ===
Currently, students from both the Diocese of Brooklyn and the Diocese of Rockville Centre attend the school, as well as one student from the Archdiocese of New York. Since 1968, each summer Cathedral has hosted the Father Edward W. Troike Leadership Program for young men of 6th and 7th grades, as well as incoming freshmen.

Since 1914 nearly 4,500 students have received high school diplomas from Cathedral Prep. The school alumni include cardinals, bishops, priests, religious and laity.

== Demographics ==
The demographic breakdown of the 132 boys enrolled for the 2019–2020 school year was:

- Native American/Alaskan - 3.1%
- Black - 5.6%
- Hispanic - 30.6%
- White - 54.4%
- Multiracial - 1.9%

== Notable alumni ==
- Vince Lombardi, National Football League coach
- Anthony Bevilacqua, archbishop-emeritus and cardinal of the Archdiocese of Philadelphia
- John Carberry, archbishop emeritus and cardinal of the Archdiocese of St. Louis
- Dennis Day, actor and singer
- Francis Mugavero, bishop of Brooklyn (1968–1990)
- John McGann, bishop of the Diocese of Rockville Centre (1976–1999)
- John Dunne, auxiliary bishop of Rockville Centre
- Gerald Barbarito, bishop of the Diocese of Palm Beach
- Gregory Sierra, actor
- John Snyder, bishop-emeritus of the Diocese of St. Augustine, Florida
- Ignatius Catanello, auxiliary bishop-emeritus of Brooklyn
- Peter Libasci, bishop of the Diocese of Manchester
- Edward Scharfenberger, bishop of the Diocese of Albany
- Joseph A. Espaillat, auxiliary bishop of the Archdiocese of New York
