= William Murphy (bishop of Rockville Centre) =

American Catholic prelate (1940–2026)

His Excellency, The Most Reverend William Francis Murphy
- Bishop of Rockville Centre
- Church: Catholic Church
- Diocese: Rockville Centre
- Appointed: June 26, 2001
- Installed: September 5, 2001
- Retired: January 31, 2017
- Predecessor: James T. McHugh
- Successor: John Barres
- Other post: Bishop Emeritus of Rockville Centre (2017‍–‍2026)
- Previous posts: Auxiliary Bishop of Boston (1995‍–‍2001); Titular Bishop of Saia Maior (1995‍–‍2001)

Orders
- Ordination: December 16, 1964 by Francis Frederick Reh
- Consecration: December 27, 1995 by Bernard Law, William Wakefield Baum, and Alfred Clifton Hughes

Personal details
- Born: May 14, 1940 Boston, Massachusetts, U.S.
- Died: March 26, 2026 (aged 85) Boston, Massachusetts, U.S.
- Buried: Queen of Peace Cemetery, Old Westbury, New York
- Motto: No other name
- Coat of arms: William Francis Murphy's coat of arms

Styles of William Francis Murphy
- Reference style: His Excellency; The Most Reverend
- Spoken style: Your Excellency
- Religious style: Bishop

Ordination history of William Murphy
History
Priestly ordination
- Ordained by: Francis Frederick Reh
- Date: December 16, 1964
- Place: St. Peter's Basilica, Rome
Episcopal consecration
- Principal consecrator: Bernard Law
- Co-consecrators: William Wakefield Baum, Alfred Clifton Hughes
- Date: December 27, 1995
- Place: Cathedral of the Holy Cross (Boston)
Episcopal succession
Bishops consecrated by William Murphy as principal consecrator
- Paul Henry Walsh: 2003
- Peter Anthony Libasci: 2007
- Nelson J. Perez: 2012
- Robert J. Brennan: 2012
- Andrzej Jerzy Zglejszewski: 2014

William Francis Murphy (May 14, 1940 – March 26, 2026) was an American prelate of the Catholic Church. He served as bishop of the Diocese of Rockville Centre on Long Island, New York in the United States, from 2001 to 2016 and as an auxiliary bishop of the Archdiocese of Boston in Massachusetts from 1995 to 2001.

== Biography ==
=== Early life ===
William Murphy was born in Boston, Massachusetts, on May 14, 1940. He had two brothers, Paul and Robert, and three sisters, Virginia, Katherine, and Cornelia Ann who became a nun as Sister Paul St. Katherine Murphy, SND de Namur. Their parents were Cornelius and Nora Veronica (Duggan) Murphy.

He received his secondary education at Boston Latin School in Boston, then attended Saint John's Seminary in Boston, receiving his Bachelor of Arts degree in 1961. Murphy then studied at the Pontifical Gregorian University, where he received a Doctor of Sacred Theology degree.

=== Priesthood ===
Murphy was ordained a priest of the Archdiocese of Boston at Saint Peter’s Basilica in Vatican City by Bishop Francis Reh on December 16, 1964. Murphy received his Licentiate in Sacred Theology in 1965 from the Gregorian University. After his ordination, Murphy returned to Massachusetts, where the archdiocese assigned him as an assistant pastor at parishes in Groveland, Winchester and East Boston. During this period, he also taught at Emmanuel College in Boston and Pope St. John XXIII National Seminary in Weston, Massachusetts.

=== Service in Rome ===
Murphy in 1974 returned to Rome to become an official in the Pontifical Council for Justice and Peace. He became a lecturer in theology at University of Saint Thomas Aquinas in Rome in 1976, teaching there for the next four years. He was named Chaplain of His Holiness by the Vatican in 1979. In 1980, Murphy was appointed as undersecretary of the Pontifical Council for Justice and Peace. He would hold that post until 1987, when he went back to Boston.

=== Service in Boston ===
After coming back to Boston in 1987, Cardinal Bernard Law appointed Murphy as secretary of community relations for the archdiocese, director of the Office of Social Justice and director of the Pope St. John XXIII National Seminary. In 1987, the Vatican named Murphy as a prelate of honor by the Vatican. He also lectured on social ethics at St. John’s Seminary.

In 1993, Law named Murphy as vicar general and moderator of the curia for the archdiocese. In this role, he was Law's principal assistant, responsible for the clergy.

=== Auxiliary Bishop of Boston ===
Pope John Paul II appointed Murphy as an auxiliary bishop of Boston on November 21, 1995. He was consecrated at the Cathedral of the Holy Cross in Boston on December 27, 1995, by Law.

=== Bishop of Rockville Centre ===
John Paul II appointed Murphy as bishop of Rockville Centre on June 26, 2001. He was installed on September 5, 2001. He signed the 1994 document Evangelicals and Catholics Together. In 2007, he was appointed the head of the Domestic Policy Committee of the U.S. Conference of Catholic Bishops (USCCB). He was fluent in English, Italian, French and Spanish.

==== Massachusetts report ====
On July 23, 2003, Massachusetts Attorney General Thomas F. Reilly released the report The Sexual Abuse of Children in the Roman Catholic Archdiocese of Boston. The report described Murphy, when auxiliary bishop in the archdiocese, as being in close consultation with Law on sexual abuse issues with clergy. The report stated that Murphy did some positive things, but also noted that

Bishop Murphy did not report to law enforcement any of the numerous allegations of clerical sexual abuse he reviewed nor did he ever advise the cardinal to do so. And even with undeniable information available to him, Bishop Murphy continued to place a higher priority on preventing scandal and providing support to alleged abusers than on protecting children from sexual abuse.

In response to the report, Murphy claimed that another archdiocesan official was in charge of these cases. On August 3, 2003, in response to the attorney general report, the Long Island chapter of the group Voice of the Faithful called for Murphy to resign. Murphy banned Voice of the Faithful from meeting on diocese property soon after that declaration.

Alan J. Placa, a Rockville Centre diocesan priest, was cleared by the tribunal of the Diocese of Albany, the home diocese of the complainant, of allegations made against him in June 2002. The decision was subsequently confirmed by the Congregation for the Doctrine of the Faith at the Vatican, which instructed Murphy "to do what we can to restore his good name".

==== Renovation of bishop's quarters ====
Soon after Murphy was installed as bishop of Rockville Centre in 2001, he decided that his private quarters in the cathedral rectory lacked privacy and sufficient space to entertain visiting clergy. He decided to take over the top floor of an old convent building at the cathedral. The diocese had been planning to create rooms for nuns on that floor, but Murphy asked them to accept some different accommodations. The project ended up costing $800,000. As news of the project and its cost became public, Murphy invited a Newsday reporter and photographer to tour the apartment. They reported that the residence included a large suite with a new fireplace with an oak mantel, a temperature-controlled wine storage cabinet, and a marble bathroom.

=== Meeting with clergy ===
In October 2003, 52 priests requested a meeting with Murphy after sending a letter that spoke of anger and dissatisfaction within the diocese and "a certain lack of confidence in your pastoral leadership". Issues raised included Murphy's management style, the cost of his new living quarters, the sexual abuse scandal in Boston and his ban against Long Island Voice of the Faithful.

==== Catholic school closings ====
In December 2011, Murphy announced the closing of six Catholic elementary schools on Long Island.

=== Resignation and death ===
On reaching age 75, the mandatory retirement age for bishops, Murphy sent a letter of resignation to the pope. On December 9, 2016, Pope Francis accepted his resignation.

Murphy died on March 26, 2026, at the age of 85, in his hometown of Boston, Massachusetts where he lived in the Regina Cleri residence for retired clergy. He is buried in Queen of Peace Cemetery, Old Westbury, New York.

== Honors and awards ==
- Honorary Doctor of Theology degree from Assumption College in Worcester, Massachusetts, in 1999.
- Honorary Doctor of Humane Letters degree from Salem State College, in Salem, Massachusetts, in 1999.
- Rabin Peacemaker Award from Merrimack College in North Andover, Massachusetts in 2002.
- Doctor of Laws degree from St. John’s University in New York City in 2002.

Murphy served as a trustee of The Catholic University of America in Washington, D.C. He was a knight commander with Star of the Equestrian Order of the Holy Sepulchre of Jerusalem, ecclesiastical commander of grace in the Sacred Military Constantinian Order of St. George, and assistant chaplain of the American Association of the Sovereign Order of Malta in 2002.

Catholic Church titles
| Preceded by James T. McHugh | Bishop of Rockville Centre; 2001–2017 | Succeeded by John Barres |
| Preceded by – | Auxiliary Bishop of Boston; 1995–2001 | Succeeded by – |
| Preceded by George To Bata | Titular Bishop of Saia Major; 1995–2001 | Succeeded by Bonifacio Antonio Reimann Panic |
