= John R. McGann =

Catholic bishop

His Excellency, The Most Reverend John Raymond McGann
- Bishop of Rockville Centre
- Church: Roman Catholic Church
- Diocese: Rockville Centre
- Installed: June 24, 1976
- Term ended: January 4, 2000
- Predecessor: Walter P. Kellenberg
- Successor: James T. McHugh
- Previous post: Auxiliary Bishop of Rockville Centre (1970 to 1976)

Orders
- Ordination: June 3, 1950 by Thomas Edmund Molloy
- Consecration: January 7, 1971 by Walter P. Kellenberg

Personal details
- Born: December 2, 1924 Brooklyn, New York, US
- Died: January 31, 2002 (aged 77) Rockville Centre, New York, US
- Buried: Cemetery of the Holy Rood; 40.7508°N 73.5844°W
- Education: Cathedral Preparatory Seminary; Immaculate Conception Seminary
- Coat of arms

John Raymond McGann (December 2, 1924 – January 29, 2002) was an American prelate of the Catholic Church. He served as bishop of the Diocese of Rockville Centre, in New York from 1976 to 2000. He previously served as an auxiliary bishop of the same diocese from 1970 to 1976.

== Biography ==
=== Early life and education ===
John McGann was born on December 2, 1924, in Brooklyn, New York, to Thomas and Mary (née Ryan) McGann. His twin sister, who took the name Sr. John Raymond McGann joined the Sisters of Saint Joseph in Brentwood, Long Island, becoming general superior of the congregation in 1978. A second sibling, Sr. Thomas Joseph, also joined the Sisters of Saint Joseph.

McGannreceived his early education at the parochial school of Our Lady of Good Counsel Church, graduating in 1938. He then began his studies for the priesthood at Cathedral College in Brooklyn, and in 1950 entered Immaculate Conception Seminary in Huntington, New York.

=== Ordination and ministry ===
On June 3, 1950, McGann was ordained a priest for the Diocese of Brooklyn by Bishop Thomas E. Molloy in Brooklyn. His first assignment was as a curate at St. Anne's Parish in Brentwood, New York, where he served for seven years. He also served as an assistant chaplain at Pilgrim State Hospital and a professor at St. Joseph's Academy, both in Brentwood (1950–1954).

In 1957, after Pope Pius XII erected the Diocese of Rockville Centre, McGann was incardinated, or transferred to the new diocese from the Diocese of Brooklyn. Bishop Walter P. Kellenberg then named McGann as assistant chancellor of the new diocese. Two years later, Kellenberg named McGann as his personal secretary. The Vatican also named hm a papal chamberlain in 1959. In addition to McGann's pastoral work at St. Agnes Cathedral in Rockville Centre, Kellenberg appointed him as vice-chancellor in 1967 and as secretary of the diocesan board of consultors.

=== Auxiliary Bishop and Bishop of Rockville Centre ===
On November 12, 1970, McGann was appointed auxiliary bishop of Rockville Centre and titular bishop of Morosbisdus by Pope Paul VI. He received his episcopal consecration on January 7, 1971, from Kellenberg, with Bishops Vincent Baldwin and Charles Mulrooney serving as co-consecrators. On May 3, 1976, McGann was appointed bishop of Rockville Centre by Paul VI. He was elected treasurer of the National Conference of Catholic Bishops in 1984.

In 1987, McGann spoke at the funeral of former Director of Central Intelligence William Casey, whose attendees included US President Ronald Reagan. McGann cited actions of the Central Intelligence Agency (CIA) in Central America during Casey's tenure as director, particularly the CIA clandestine support for the Contra rebels in Nicaragua. McGann remarked:

"His conviction about the fundamentally moral purpose of American action, I am sure, made incomprehensible to him the ethical questions raised by me as his bishop, together with all the Catholic bishops of the United States, about our nation's defense policy since the dawn of the nuclear age."

=== Retirement and death ===
Pope John Paul II accepted McGann's resignation as bishop of Rockville Centre on January 4, 2000. He was succeeded by Bishop James T. McHugh, who had served as his coadjutor bishop since 1999. John McGann died at Mercy Medical Center in Rockville Centre on January 31, 2002, at age 77.

Two women and one man filed a lawsuit in 2019 claiming that McGann and other clergy and personnel of the Diocese of Rockville Centre sexually abused them as children in the 1960s and '70s.

- The Radiology & Imaging Center at Mercy Medical Center is named for McGann,
- Bishop McGann-Mercy Diocesan High School in Riverhead, New York, was named after McGann.
- Bishop John R. McGann Village is a senior low-income housing apartment in Bay Shore, New York.

== See also ==
- Catholic Church in the United States
- Historical list of the Catholic bishops of the United States
- List of the Catholic bishops of the United States
- Lists of patriarchs, archbishops, and bishops

Catholic Church titles
Preceded by Walter P. Kellenberg	Bishop of Rockville Centre; 1976–2000	Succeeded by James T. McHugh
Preceded by –	Auxiliary Bishop of Rockville Centre; 1970–1976	Succeeded by –
