= New York Institute of Technology College of Osteopathic Medicine =

Medical school based in New York state

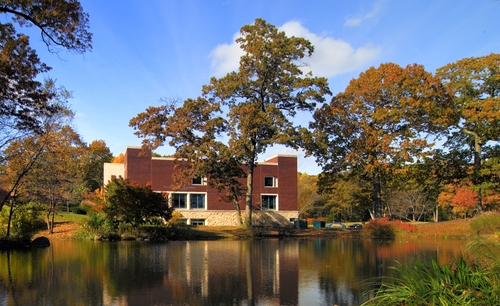
- Motto: Hands, Minds, and Hearts
- Type: Private medical school
- Established: 1977
- Parent institution: New York Institute of Technology
- Budget: $102.94 million (2023)
- Dean: Nicole Wadsworth
- Faculty: 350
- Students: 1,270 Old Westbury; 487 Jonesboro
- Location: Old Westbury, NY; Jonesboro, AR, US; 40°48′34″N 73°36′20″W
- Campus: Suburban, 1050 acres.
- Newspaper: www.nycomsga.org/pulse
- Colors: Blue and Gold
- Website: www.nyit.edu/medicine
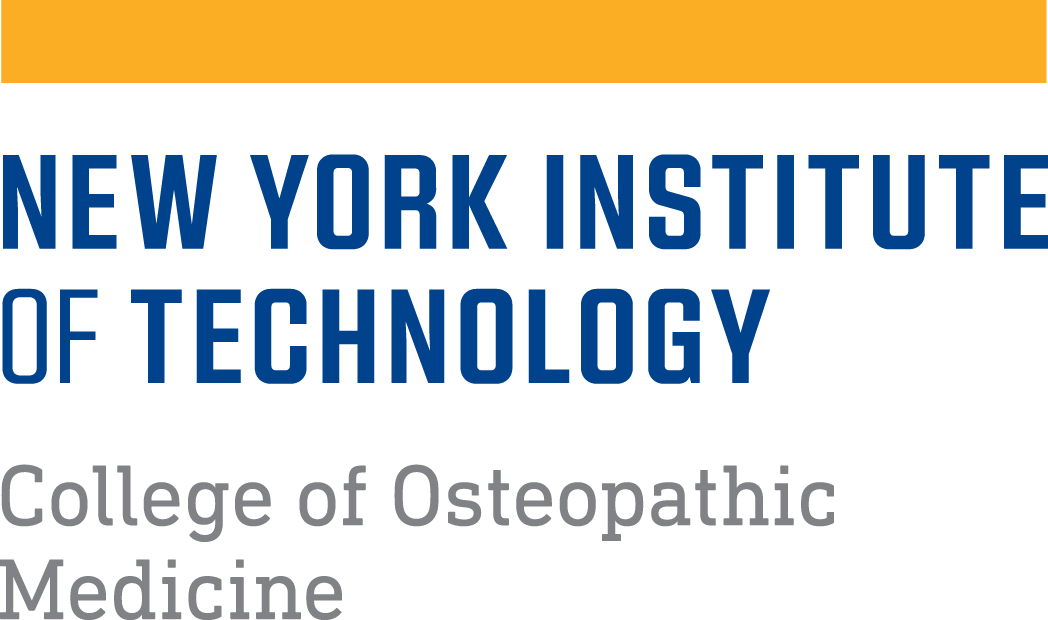

The New York Institute of Technology College of Osteopathic Medicine (NYIT-COM) is a private medical school located primarily in Old Westbury, New York. It also has a degree-granting campus in Jonesboro, Arkansas. Founded in 1977, NYIT-COM is an academic division of the New York Institute of Technology. Formerly the New York College of Osteopathic Medicine, it is one of the largest medical schools in the United States. In 2025, the NYIT College of Osteopathic Medicine had a 97.5% match rate and a 96.96% COMLEX Level 1 pass rate.

== History ==
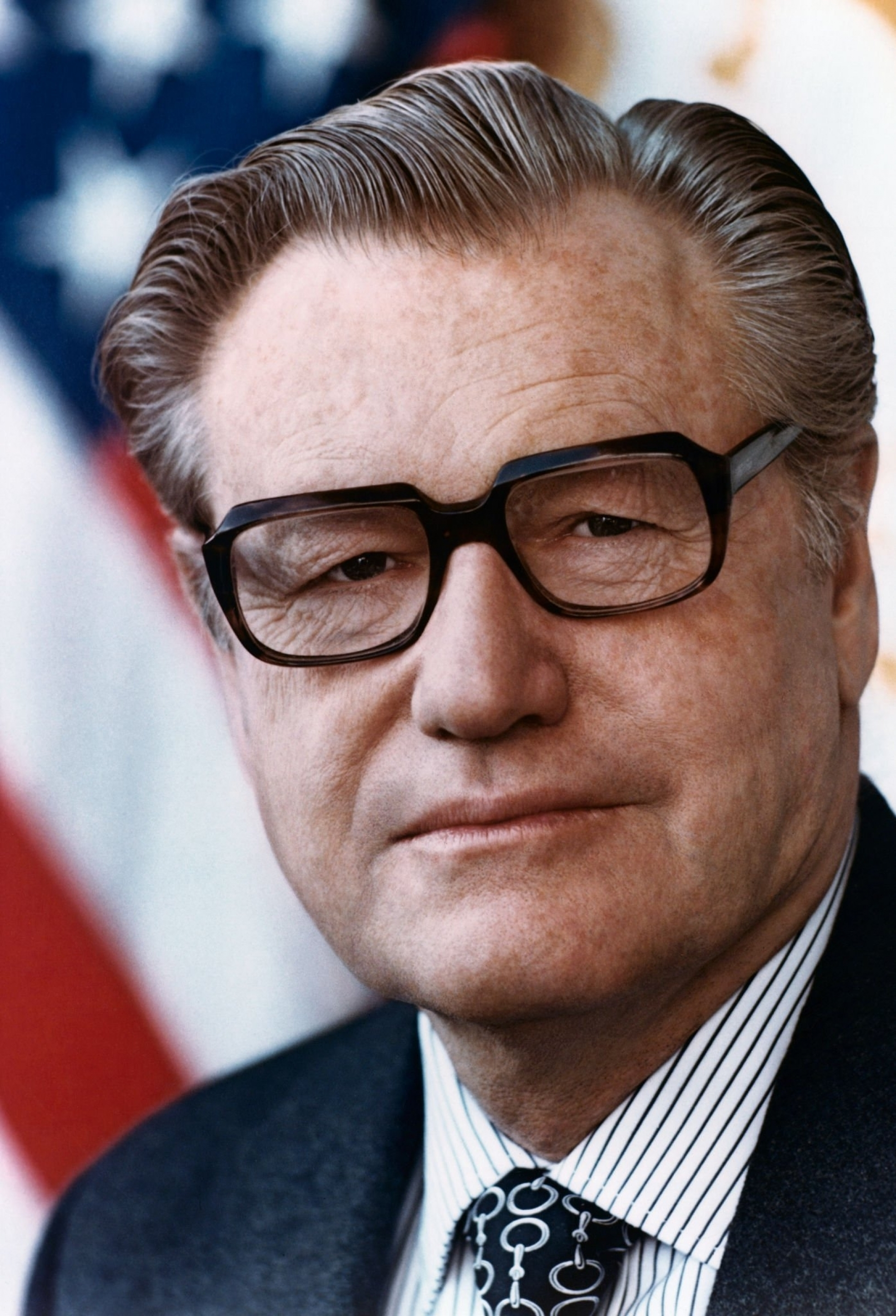
Nelson A. Rockefeller, 41st vice-president of the United States, 49th Governor of New York State, and co-founder of the New York College of Osteopathic Medicine, now known as the NYIT College of Osteopathic Medicine

The college opened in 1977, as the first osteopathic medical school in the state of New York, offering the Doctor of Osteopathic Medicine degree (D.O.). The college was established through the efforts of W. Kenneth Riland, an osteopathic physician (D.O.), and New York State Governor Nelson A. Rockefeller and members of the Rockefeller family. The college was granted accreditation by the American Osteopathic Association (AOA), and was chartered under New York State law through the efforts of Gov. Nelson A. Rockefeller. In 1978, Nelson Rockefeller contributed $250,000 to the college's general endowment fund and in 1979 Laurance Rockefeller contributed the same amount. The friendship between Nelson Rockefeller and W. Kenneth Riland was an important factor in the founding of the medical college. Riland served as Mr. Rockefeller's personal physician during his governorship of New York as well as during his vice-presidency in the Ford administration. To honor the efforts and contributions of Governor Rockefeller, the Nelson A. Rockefeller Academic Center was dedicated in 1979.

The inaugural class of 34 students graduated on June 11, 1981. An honorary Doctor of Laws degree was awarded to W. Kenneth Riland, who was honored for his role in the establishment of the college. The W. Kenneth Riland Academic Health Care Center, completed in 1984, is located on campus and serves as a clinic and teaching hospital.

In 1999, construction began on campus for the new Hannah and Charles Serota Academic Center. In 2001, the building opened for basic and pre-clinical science lectures, as well as the osteopathic manipulative medicine laboratory.

On December 5, 2012, the 35 year old name of the school was officially changed from New York College of Osteopathic Medicine of New York Institute of Technology (NYCOM of NYIT) to the New York Institute of Technology College of Osteopathic Medicine (NYIT College of Osteopathic Medicine).

In 2016, a second NYITCOM campus was added at Arkansas State University.

== Campus ==
The NYIT-COM Old Westbury is located at the 1050-acre suburban campus of New York Institute of Technology in Old Westbury, New York.

The NYIT-COM Jonesboro campus is located at Arkansas State University in Jonesboro, AR.

== Medical Education ==
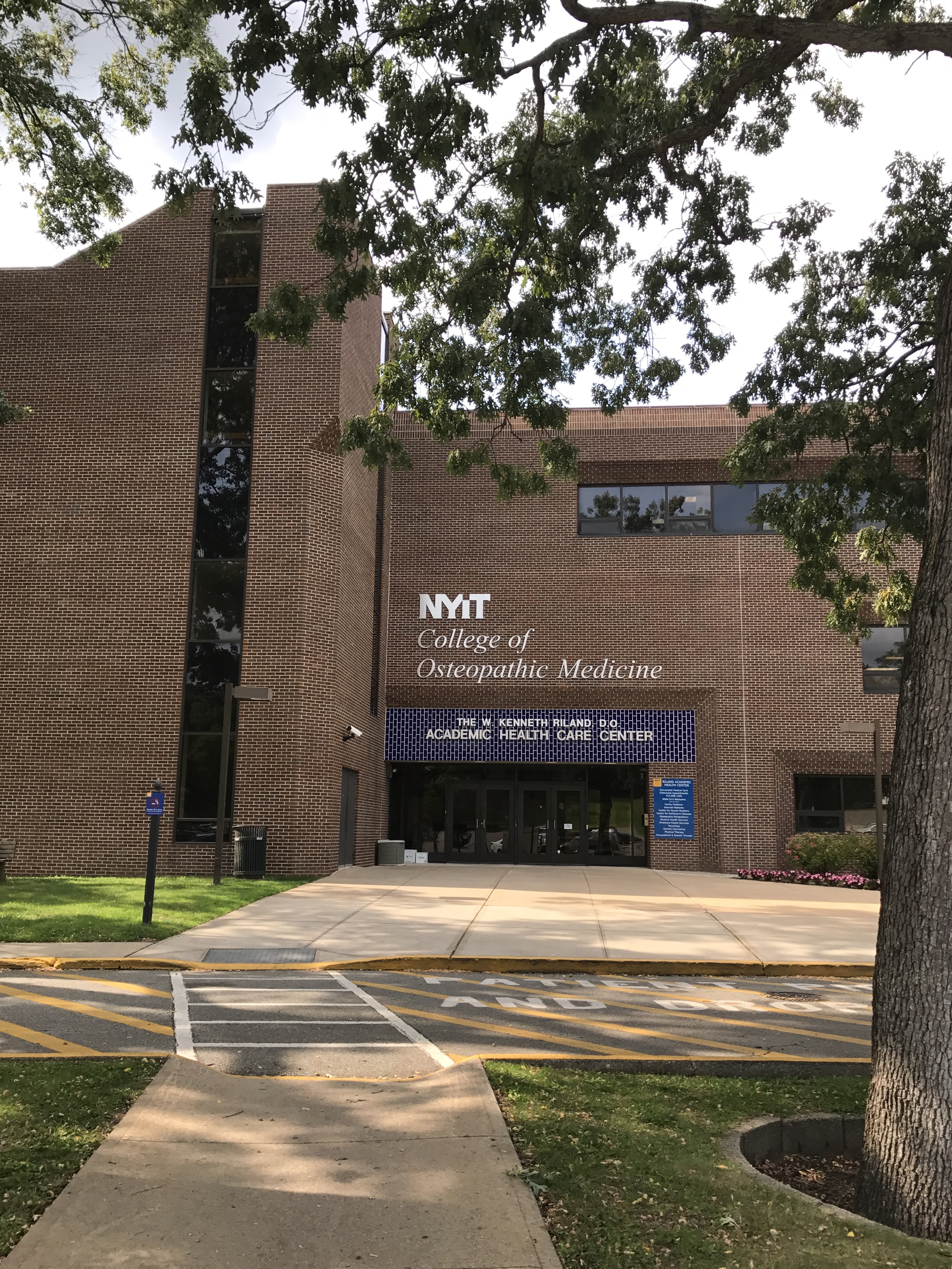
W. Kenneth Riland, D.O. Academic Health Care Center houses the primary care clinic, study rooms, cafeteria and Gross Anatomy/Neuroanatomy Laboratories.

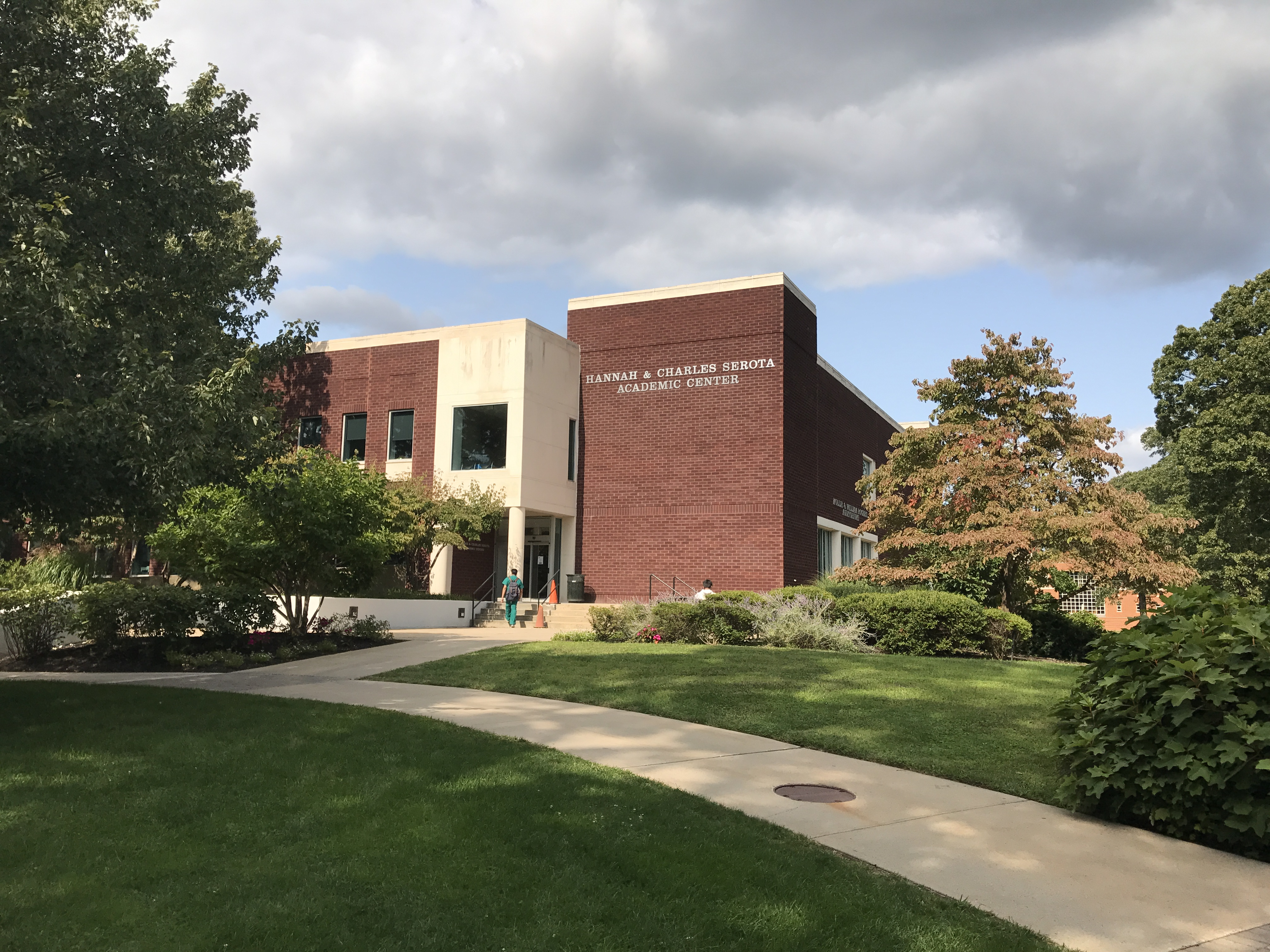
Hannah and Charles Serota Academic Center houses the Office of Pre-Clinical Sciences, Office of Clinical Sciences, Office of Admissions, OMM Laboratory, Office of the Registrar, various administrative offices and 2 large amphitheater lecture halls used for basic science and pre-clinical science lectures.

NYIT College of Osteopathic Medicine offers five dual/concurrent degree programs: BS/DO, DO/MBA, DO/MPH, DO/MS in Academic Medicine and DO/PhD in Medical and Biological Sciences. Qualifying high school students can apply to the combined seven-year BS/DO students through NYIT as well as SUNY New Paltz, SUNY Geneseo, and SUNY Old Westbury.

Medical students at NYIT College of Osteopathic Medicine complete their clerkship blocks at various affiliated hospitals, ambulatory care centers, and clinics located throughout Long Island, Brooklyn, Bronx, Queens, Upstate New York, New Jersey and Connecticut, most of which are also members of the College of Osteopathic Medicine Educational Consortium (NYCOMEC). Because the school does not have an affiliated teaching hospital, third and fourth year students are matched to clinical sites via a match system.

The college provides the opportunity to obtain medical training in the United States for physicians educated outside of the United States through its Émigré Physicians Program (EPP). After completion of the 4-year EPP program, graduates receive the Doctor of Osteopathic Medicine (DO) degree and are able to apply to DO and MD residency match programs as American graduates. The college provides its alumni and other osteopathic medical graduates with residency and internship training opportunities through the New York Colleges of Osteopathic Medicine Educational Consortium (NYCOMEC). All graduates of the college are eligible to apply for ACGME (MD), AOA (DO), and dually accredited ACGME-AOA residencies.

=== Curriculum ===
NYIT College of Osteopathic Medicine has a systems-based curriculum where students study select organ systems each semester for their first and second years. Pre-clerkship students take longitudinal OMM, case-based learning, and clinical skills courses that last the duration of the first and second years. Students typically take COMLEX Level 1 the summer of their second year before starting the clerkship phase of their medical education. Many students also elect to take USMLE Step 1 during same summer to increase their competitiveness for residency programs dominated by allopathic medical graduates. Third year medical students at NYIT College of Osteopathic Medicine are required to rotate through Emergency Medicine, Family Medicine, Internal Medicine, OBGYN, Pediatrics, Psychiatry, and Surgery. Fourth year students have dedicated study time for COMLEX Level 2 and USMLE Step 2.

=== Admissions ===
In 2025 NYIT College of Osteopathic Medicine Old Westbury had 8,697 applicants of which 417 matriculated (4.6%). Matriculated students had a mean MCAT score of 505.2 (62nd percentile) and a mean cumulative undergraduate GPA of 3.67.

=== Accreditation ===
The college is accredited by the American Osteopathic Association's Commission on Osteopathic College Accreditation (COCA). It is also listed among the World Directory of Medical Schools as a fully-accredited "medical school in the United States" along with other accredited doctorate-level allopathic (MD) and osteopathic medicine (DO) programs.

== Notable alumni ==
New York Institute of Technology College of Osteopathic Medicine has over 9000 alumni as of 2025. Notable alumni include:

- Humayun Chaudhry, president and CEO of the Federation of State Medical Boards
- Richard Jadick, U.S. Navy physician who saved the lives of 30 marines and sailors during the Second Battle of Fallujah, earning the Bronze Star
- Frank LoVecchio, medical toxicology academic and researcher
- Kevin O’Connor, physician to President Joe Biden and retired U.S. Army Colonel
- Amit M. Shelat, Chairman of the New York State Board for Medicine (2024 to Current); Vice-Chairman (2018 to 2024), Office of the Professions, New York State Education Department. First NYITCOM alumnus and only the second osteopathic physician in the 220-year history of the New York State Board for Medicine to serve as Chairman.
- Mikhail "Mike" Varshavski, commonly known as Doctor Mike, celebrity doctor and YouTuber
- Jill Wruble, radiologist
