= St. Agnes Cathedral (Rockville Centre, New York) =

Historic church in Rockville Centre, New York, United States

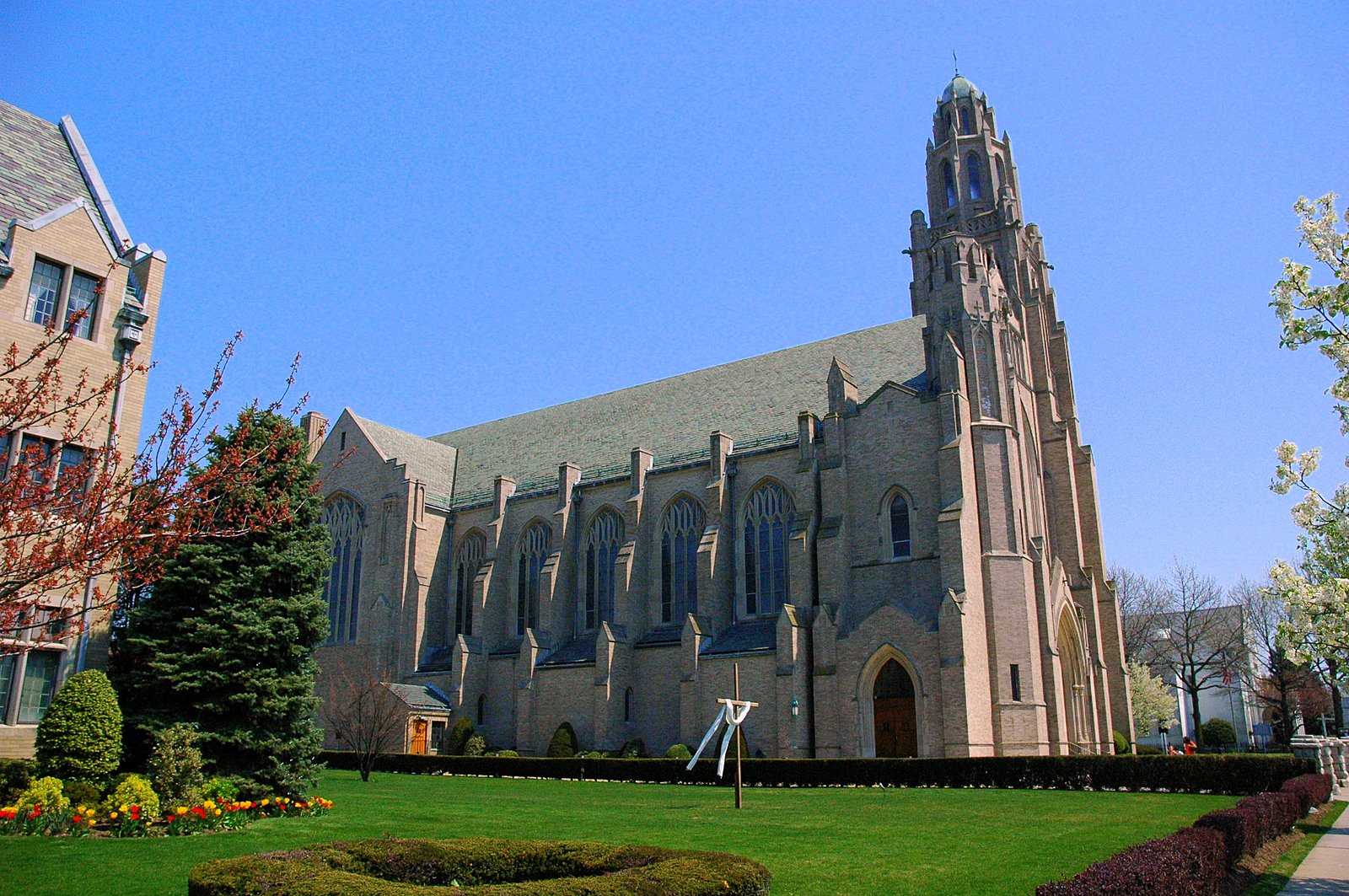

- Location within New York
- 40°39′35.3″N 73°38′46.64″W
- Location: 29 Quealy Place; Rockville Centre, New York
- Country: United States
- Denomination: Roman Catholic Church
- Website: www.stagnescathedral.org

History
- Founded: 1887

Architecture
- Architect: Gustave E. Steinbeck
- Style: Gothic Revival
- Groundbreaking: 1933
- Completed: 1935

Specifications
- Materials: Brick

Administration
- Diocese: Diocese of Rockville Centre

Clergy
- Bishop: John Barres
- Rector: Very Rev. Michael F. Duffy

St. Agnes Cathedral is a Roman Catholic Cathedral in Rockville Centre, New York, in the United States. It is the seat of the Diocese of Rockville Centre.

John Oliver Barres is the ordinary bishop of the diocese and pastor of the cathedral parish. The Saint Agnes Cathedral School shares the same campus with the cathedral.

== History ==
=== St. Agnes Church ===
Before 1887, there was no Catholic church in Rockville Centre. That same year, six Catholic families began gathering at a blacksmith shop in the town to celebrate mass whenever a priest was visiting. An anvil in shop was used as an altar; today, it is on display outside the current cathedral.

By 1890, the congregation had outgrown the blacksmith shop; they rented Gildersleeve's Hall in the local Institute Building for their services. The next year, the congregation purchased a land parcel with a former school building that they planned to convert into a church. St. Agnes Parish was erected by Bishop Charles Edward McDonnell of Brooklyn in 1894.

In 1905, the parish replaced the school house with a white marble stone church on the same property. Five Dominican Sisters opened the St. Agnes Cathedral School in 1917. A high school for girls was completed on the campus in 1924 and a new convent in 1928. In 1935, the parish dedicated a new St. Agnes church. By 1942, the parish had 1400 families as members.

=== St. Agnes Cathedral ===
In 1957, Pope Pius XII erected the Diocese of Rockville Centre and designated St. Agnes Church as St. Agnes Cathedral. The parish added an addition to its primary school in 1961 and built a new rectory in 1965

The diocese in 1981 began a major renovation at St. Agnes Cathedral. A small chapel was erected in the parking lot for daily masses until the building was finished in 1982. Due to financial constraints and declining enrollment, St. Agnes High School was moved to Uniondale. In 1986, Mother Teresa visited St. Agnes Cathedral and spoke at a prayer service.

St. Agnes Cathedral received its second pipe organ in 2001 and a new Parish Activity Center in 2004. A plaque was installed at St. Agnes in 2006 to honor the parishioners who were killed during the September 11, 2001 attack on the World Trade Center in New York City.

In 2007, the diocese and St. Agnes Cathedral celebrated their 50th anniversaries. During a snowstorm in 2010, the bell tower of St. Agnes was struck by lightning, causing some damage to the pipe organ, the electrical system and the heating system. Hurricane Sandy in 2012 toppled the stone cross from the top of the bell tower, forcing its replacement.

Michael Wustrow, the music director at St. Agnes Cathedral, was arrested in February 2019 on charges of receiving child pornography. He was terminated by the diocese and pleaded guilty to charges in June 2019.

== Cathedral interior ==
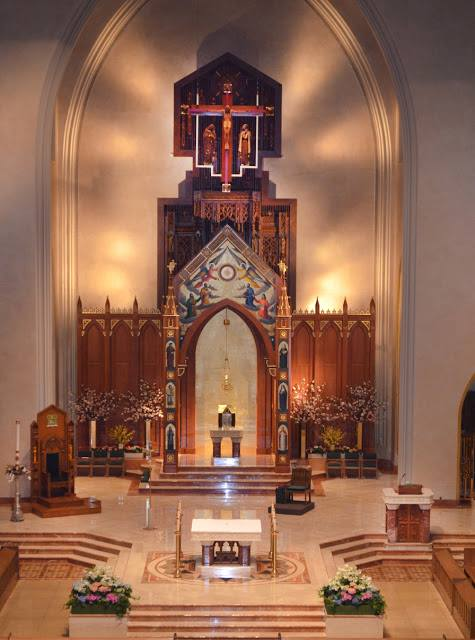
Chancel, St. Agnes Cathedral (2021)

=== Altar ===
The altar contains an wooden reliquary with relics of four saints:

- Agnes of Rome – a 4th century Roman teenager executed for refusing to renounce Christianity
- Elizabeth Ann Seton – a 19th century American nun who established schools for poor children around the country
- Frances Xavier Cabrini – a 19th century American nun who established schools and orphanages for Italian immigrants
- John Neumann – a 19th century American missionary and bishop

The flooring beneath the altar is made of Botticino marble, with a floor mosaic surrounding the altar. The altar is flanked on the sanctuary walls by three icons:

- Baptism of Jesus by St. John the Baptist
- Blessed Virgin Holding the Child Jesus.
- St Agnes with St. Catherine of Alexandria

Located behind the altar is a wooden reredos that displays carvings of the 12 apostles, religious symbols and a Jerusalem Cross. The rederos was refinished in 2016.

=== Ambo ===
The ambo, or pulpit is constructed of marble. It displays wooden tiles that depict the Four Evangelists (Matthew, Mark, Luke and John). A leaf pattern circles the top of the ambo, with symbols of Alpha and Omega along with the cross.

=== Baptismal font ===
The baptismal font contains an ambry in the back, which houses the sacred oils. It has its own water supply for baptismal ceremonies. The current font was installed in 2016.

=== Cathedra ===
The cathedra, or bishop's throne, displays the coat of arms and motto for the current bishop of Rockville Centre. It was restored in 2016.

=== Pipe organs ===
After St. Agnes Church became a cathedral in 1957, the diocese purchased a pipe organ from the Wurlitzer Company of Cincinnati, Ohio. By 1972, the Wurlitzer organ needed replacement. Monsignor Edward Melton, then the cathedral rector, opted to spend the money on maintaining the parish schools rather than purchasing a new pipe organ. The parish bought two electric organs for its music programs instead. In 2001, the diocese finally installed a new pipe organ from the Wicks Organ Company of Highland, Illinois, in the cathedral.

== Cathedral exterior ==
=== Bell tower ===
The cathedral has a 150 feet (46 m) high bell tower that contains the bell from the original St. Agnes Church. The tower is encircled by a stone cornice with an open stone tracery railing. It divides the square lower section of the tower from the octagonal upper section. Gargoyles are mounted on the corners of the tower. The tower is topped by a leaded-copper cupola with a cross.

=== Walls ===
The cathedral walls are constructed of buff-colored brick with limestone trimmings. The cathedral has a 30-foot arched tracery window divided into five lancets. The gable above this window is mounted by a stone cross. The facade has several arched recesses, with the middle one holding a statue of Agnes of Rome.

=== Main entrance ===
The main entrance to the cathedral has two sets of paneled oak doors. A tracery rose window is located above the doors, along with a stone statue of Christ the King. The cornerstone of the cathedral is located to the left of the main entrance.

== Music ministries ==
As of 2026, St. Agnes Cathedral maintains seven choirs and two ensembles, all directed by Michael L. Bower:

- Children's Choir
- Junior Girls’ Choir
- Senior Girls’ Choir
- Choir of Men and Boys
- Cathedral Chorale and Schola Cantorum
- Spanish Choir
- Contemporary Music Ensembles
- Resurrection Choir

== Cathedral staff ==
=== Current clergy ===
The following are the cathedral clergy as of 2026:

==== Bishop ====
MJohn Oliver Barres bishop of Rockville Centre

==== Parish clergy ====
- Michael F. Duffy, rector
- Christopher P. Heller
- Michael Ngoka

==== Clergy in residence ====
- Eric Fasano
- Lachlan Cameron, vicar for clergy

=== Rectors and cathedral administrators ===
- Edward L. Melton (1967 to 1986) cathedral administrator
- Robert Mulligan (1986 to 1996) rector
- James Kelly (1997 to 2007) rector
- Robert Guglielmone (2007 to 2009) rector
- William Koenig (2009 to 2020) rector
- Michael Duffy (2020 to present) rector

== St. Agnes Cathedral School ==
The St. Agnes Elementary School, located on the cathedral campus, was founded by five Dominican sisters in 1917. It was built with ten classrooms to accommodate 60 students.. In 1957, the diocese purchased an unused school building from the Rockville Centre Public School District and renovated it, creating 32 classrooms. It became the St. Agnes Cathedral School. As of 2026, it was the largest K-8 school in the diocese. As of 2026, Cecilia St. John serves as principal and Mary Brower as assistant principal.

== See also ==
- List of Catholic cathedrals in the United States
- Diocese of Rockville Centre
