= Gerald Barbarito =

American prelate (born 1950)

His Excellency, The Most Reverend Gerald Barbarito
- Bishop Emeritus of Palm Beach
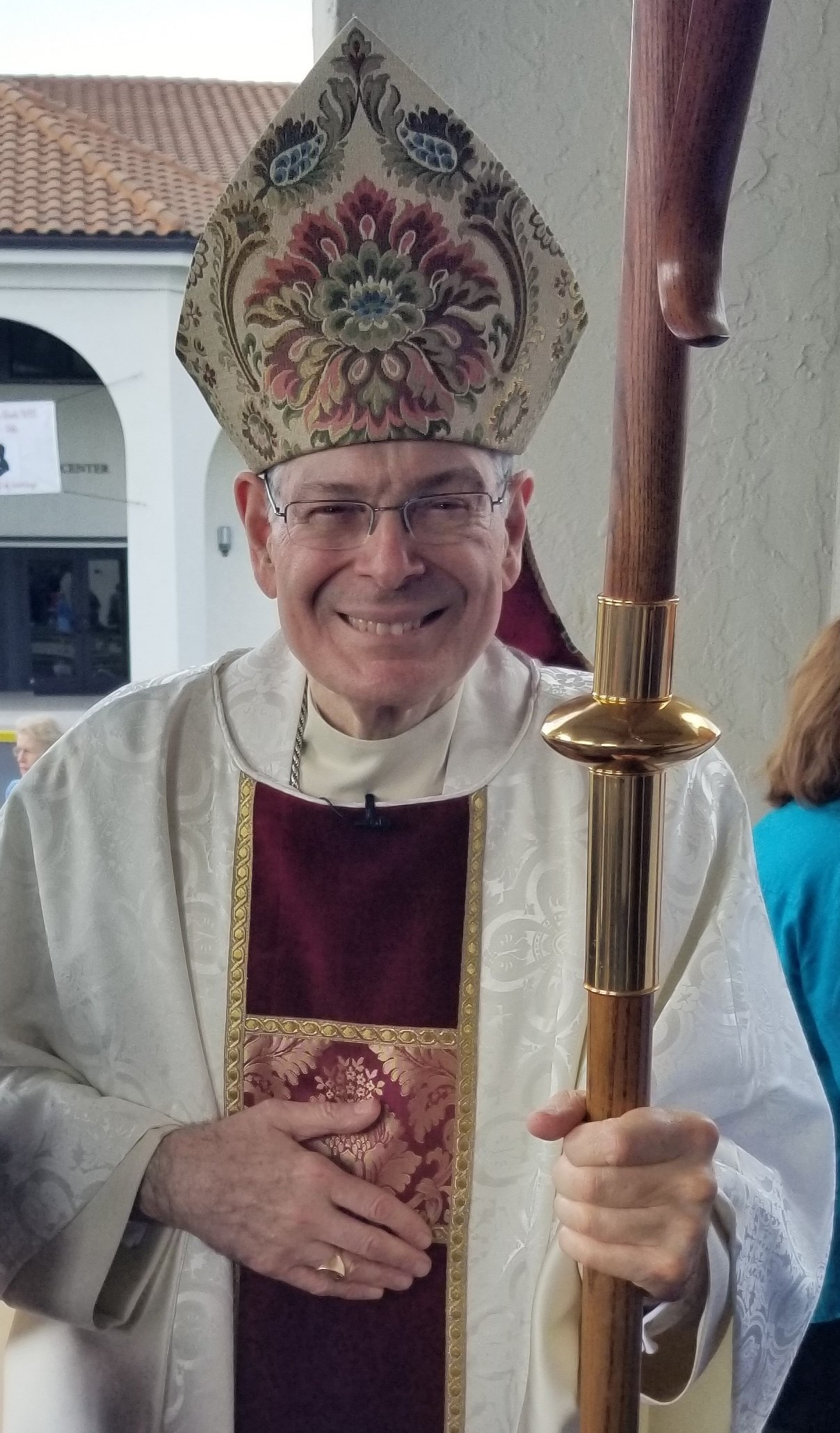
- Bishop Barbarito in February 2023
- Church: Catholic Church
- Archdiocese: Miami
- Diocese: Palm Beach
- Appointed: July 1, 2003
- Installed: August 28, 2003
- Retired: December 19, 2025
- Predecessor: Seán Patrick O'Malley
- Successor: Manuel de Jesús Rodríguez
- Previous posts: Bishop of Ogdensburg (1999–2003); Auxiliary Bishop of Brooklyn and Titular Bishop of Gisipa (1994–1999)

Orders
- Ordination: January 31, 1976 by Francis Mugavero
- Consecration: August 22, 1994 by Thomas Vose Daily, Joseph Michael Sullivan, and René Arnold Valero

Personal details
- Born: January 4, 1950 (age 76) Brooklyn, New York, US
- Education: Cathedral College; Immaculate Conception Seminary; Catholic University of America
- Motto: Veritatem facientes in caritate (Professing the truth in love)

Styles of Gerald Barbarito
- Reference style: His Excellency; The Most Reverend
- Spoken style: Your Excellency
- Religious style: Bishop

Gerald Michael Barbarito (born January 4, 1950) is an American Catholic prelate who served as bishop of Palm Beach in Florida from 2003 until 2026. Barbarito previously served as bishop of Ogdensburg in New York State from 1999 to 2003 and as an auxiliary bishop of the Diocese of Brooklyn in New York City from 1994 to 1999.

== Biography ==
=== Early life and family ===
Gerald Michael Barbarito, the son of Anna Marie LaPorte Barbarito and Samuel A. Barbarito, was born in Brooklyn, New York, on January 4, 1950. He began his studies for the priesthood at Cathedral Prep Seminary in Fort Greene, Brooklyn, graduating in 1967.

=== Education ===
Barbarito continued his studies at Cathedral College in Douglaston, Queens, where he earned a bachelor's degree in 1971. His theology studies took place at Immaculate Conception Seminary in Huntington, New York, where he received a Master of Divinity degree in 1975. Before his ordination to the priesthood, Barbarito served as a deacon at St. Francis of Assisi Parish in Astoria, Queens, for one year.

==== Ordination and pastoral work ====
Barbarito was ordained to the priesthood for the Diocese of Brooklyn by Bishop Francis J. Mugavero at St. Francis of Assisi Church in Brooklyn on January 31, 1976.

After his 1976 ordination, the diocese assigned Barbarito to St. Helen's Parish in Howard Beach, Queens, in New York City. He remained there until 1981, when Mugavero appointed him assistant chancellor. Barbarito held this position for one year, then went to the Catholic University of America School of Canon Law in Washington D.C. for two years. He earned a Licentiate of Canon Law in 1984.

After Barbarito returned to New York, he was named the vice chancellor of the diocese in 1984. He remained in that position until 1992, when Bishop Thomas Vose Daily appointed him secretary. Barbarito served as master of ceremonies for Auxiliary Bishop Emeritus Joseph Peter Michael Denning from 1984 to 1990.

Barbarito served on the college of consultors, the priests' personnel board, the presbyteral council and as an appellate judge at the diocesan tribunal. He also served as a consultant to the Canonical Affairs Committee of the National Conference of Catholic Bishops.

=== Auxiliary Bishop of Brooklyn ===
Barbarito was appointed as an auxiliary bishop of Brooklyn by Pope John Paul II on June 28, 1994. He was consecrated at the Basilica of Our Lady of Perpetual Help in Brooklyn on August 22, 1994. Bishop Thomas Vose Daily served as principal consecrator, with Bishops Joseph Michael Sullivan and René Arnold Valero serving as co-consecrators.

Barbarito was assigned as regional bishop for Brooklyn Vicariate East as well as vicar for ministry for the diocese. As the vicar for ministry, he assisted with the ongoing formation of priests.

=== Bishop of Ogdensburg ===
Coat of Arms as Bishop of Ogdensburg

On October 26, 1999, John Paul II named Barbarito as bishop of Ogdensburg. He filled the vacancy left when Bishop Paul Loverde was appointed the Bishop of Arlington nine months prior.

=== Bishop of Palm Beach ===
On July 1, 2003, Barbarito was appointed by John Paul II as the fifth bishop of Palm Beach to succeed Bishop Seán O'Malley who had been named archbishop of the Archdiocese of Boston. Barbarito was installed on August 28, 2003, at the Cathedral of St. Ignatius Loyola. In January 2015, Barbarito underwent a successful seven-hour surgery in Miami to remove a benign brain tumor.

In February 2012, Barbarito signed a letter with the other Catholic bishops of Florida asking Florida Governor Rick Scott to stop the execution of Robert Waterhouse, a convicted murderer. Scott allowed Waterhouse to be executed that month.

On December 19, 2025, Pope Leo XIV accepted his resignation, after handing in his mandatory letter of resignation at the age of 75.

Barbarito is a member of the Catholic Biblical Association and the Canon Law Society of America.

== Viewpoints ==
Barbarito is an opponent of abortion.

Catholic Church titles
Preceded by Seán Patrick O'Malley	Bishop of Palm Beach; 2003–2026	Succeeded by Manuel de Jesús Rodríguez
Preceded by Paul Stephen Loverde	Bishop of Ogdensburg; 1999–2003	Succeeded by Robert Joseph Cunningham
Preceded by -	Auxiliary Bishop of Brooklyn; 1994–1999	Succeeded by -
