= Cathedral of the Sacred Heart (Pensacola, Florida) =

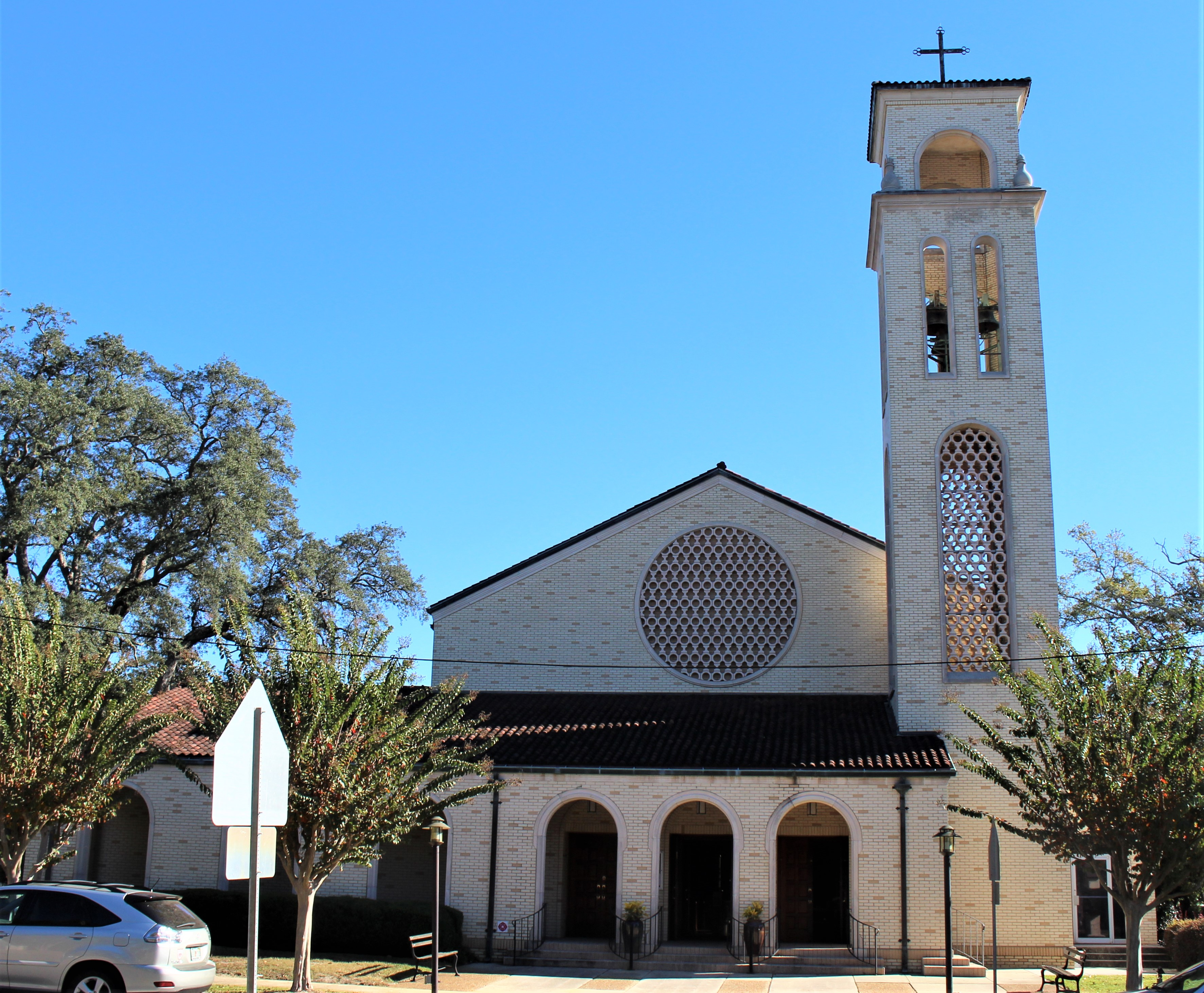

- Location within Florida Location within the United States
- 30°25′53.98″N 87°12′14.63″W
- Location: 1212 E. Moreno St. Pensacola, Florida
- Country: United States
- Denomination: Roman Catholic
- Website: www.shc.ptdiocese.org

History
- Status: Cathedral
- Founded: 1905
- Dedication: Sacred Heart of Jesus
- Dedicated: May 18, 1967

Architecture
- Style: Modern Romanesque

Specifications
- Materials: Brick

Administration
- Diocese: Pensacola-Tallahassee

Clergy
- Bishop: William Albert Wack
- Rector: Very Reverend Steve Olson, JCL

The Cathedral of the Sacred Heart, is the seat of the Bishop of the Roman Catholic Diocese of Pensacola-Tallahassee. It shares this distinction with the Co-Cathedral of Saint Thomas More in Tallahassee. The cathedral is named in honor of the Sacred Heart of Jesus, and is located in Pensacola, Florida.

== History ==
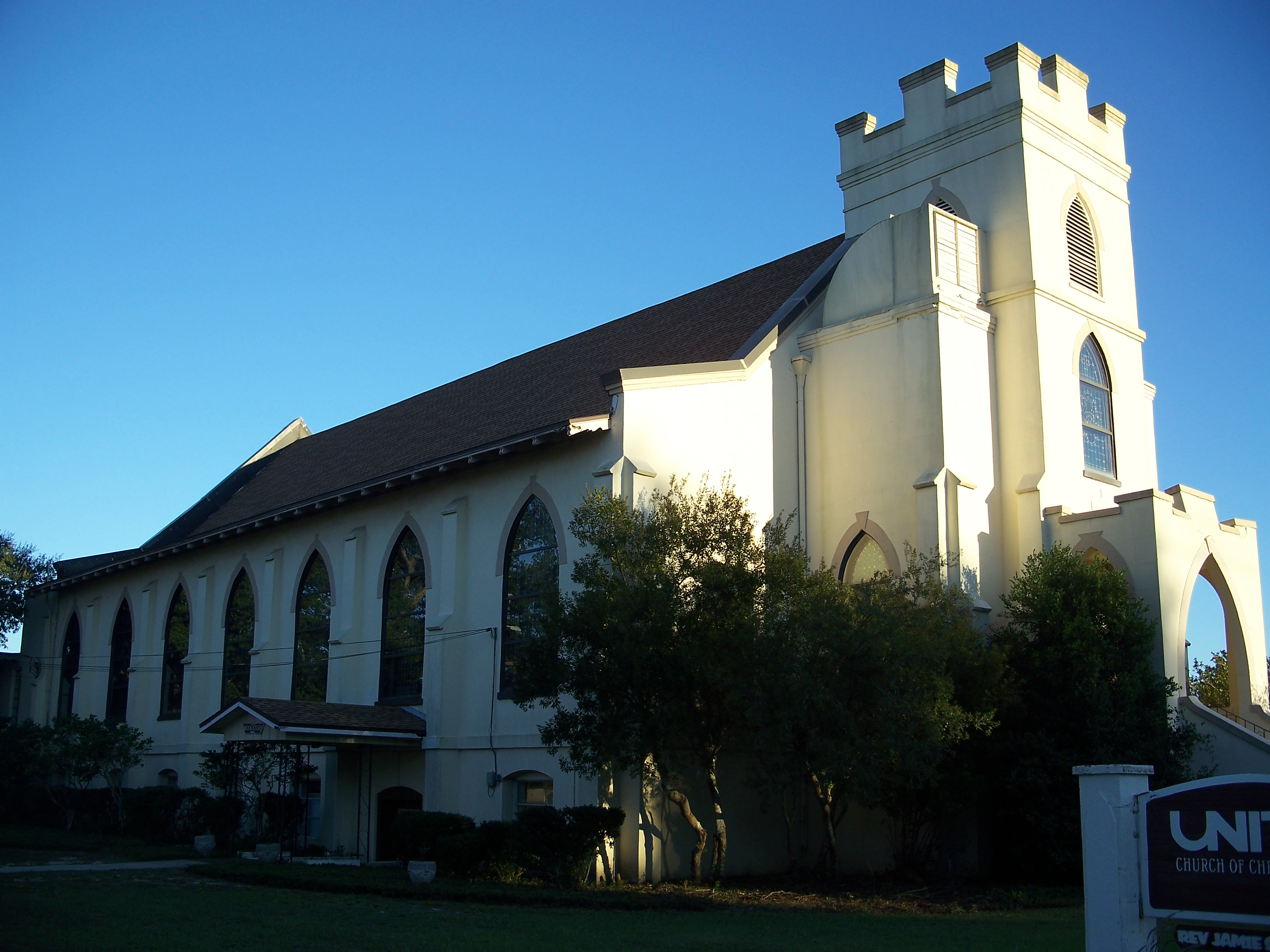
The original Sacred Heart Church

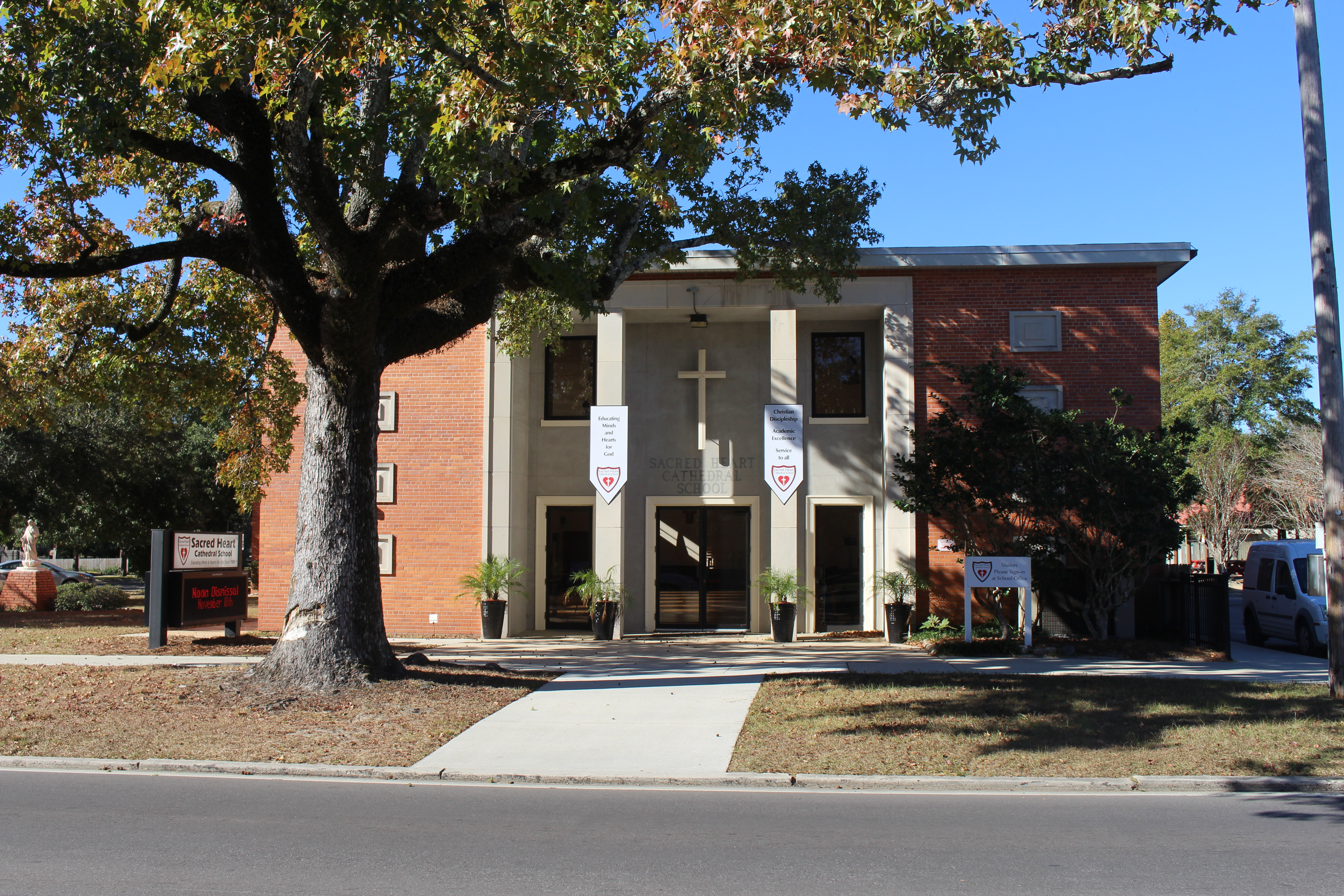
Sacred Heart Cathedral School

Pensacola was in the Diocese of Mobile when Bishop Edward Allen appointed Father Fullerton from St. Michael's Church in 1905 to supervise the construction of Sacred Heart Church. The new church was still under construction when a hurricane struct the city in 1906 and destroyed the roof. It was rebuilt and Bishop Allen dedicated the Gothic Revival church in April 1907. At the time the parish had twenty-five families.

The parish school was founded in 1907 as Sacred Heart Academy. It was staffed by the Sisters of Perpetual Adoration, later known as the Sisters of the Most Holy Sacrament. It educated both boys and girls separately and it had girls who were boarders. The Sisters of the Most Holy Sacrament left in 1945 and were replaced by Benedictine Sisters for a year. They were replaced by the Dominican Sisters of Adrian, Michigan who stayed until 1970. It was during their administration that boarding students was discontinued.

The city experienced a lumber boom in the early 20th century and Pensacola and the East Hill neighborhood, where Sacred Heart was located, experienced rapid growth. Within 50 years the congregation determined it needed a larger building. The present school building was completed in 1951 and opened in 1952. The gym-parish hall was also used for the parish church. The old church was sold for $100 to the city of Pensacola on September 11, 1956. They deeded the structure to the Greater Pensacola Symphony Orchestra. The building is now listed on the National Register of Historic Places.

The present church was dedicated by Archbishop Thomas Toolen of Mobile on May 18, 1967. It is a brick building designed in a Modern interpretation of the Romanesque Basilica style. In 1968 the Ecclesiastical Province of Miami was established and the ten counties of northwest Florida that belonged to the Diocese of Mobile, including Pensacola, were transferred to the Diocese of St. Augustine. The Diocese of Pensacola-Tallahassee was established by Pope Paul VI in 1975. On November 6 of that year, Miami Auxiliary Bishop René Gracida was installed as the diocese's first bishop. Sacred Heart Church was named as the diocesan cathedral and St. Thomas More Church in Tallahassee as the co-cathedral.

== See also ==
- List of Catholic cathedrals in the United States
- List of cathedrals in Florida
