= Ignatius Anthony Catanello =

American prelate

Styles of Ignatius Anthony Catanello
- Reference style: The Most Reverend
- Spoken style: Your Excellency
- Religious style: Monsignor
- Posthumous style: not applicable

Ignatius Anthony Catanello (July 23, 1938 – March 11, 2013) was an American prelate of the Roman Catholic Church. From 1994 to 2010 he served as an auxiliary bishop of the Diocese of Brooklyn.

== Early life ==
One of two children, Catanello was born in Brooklyn, New York, July 23, 1938 to Nicholas Catanello and Mary DeFalco. He attended Most Holy Trinity School and High School in Williamsburg. After high school he entered the novitiate of the Order of Augustinian Recollects in Kansas City, Kansas, and then spent a year in their seminary before deciding to pursue the life of a secular priest. He then returned to New York for studies at Cathedral College, the college-level seminary of the Brooklyn Diocese. He also attended St. Francis College, from where he earned a Bachelor's degree. He then did his theological studies at Immaculate Conception Seminary in Huntington.

== Priest ==
Catanello was ordained to the priesthood by Bishop Bryan McEntegart on May 28, 1966. He ministered successively in the parishes of St. Rita's, Long Island City; St. Helen's, Howard Beach; St. Ann's, Flushing; and Our Lady of Angels, Bay Ridge.

Throughout his early priesthood, Catanello pursued graduate degrees, earning a Master's degree in both theology and counseling from St. John's University and a doctorate in religious studies from New York University. For 27 years he taught theology at St. John's as an adjunct professor, and the university honored him with its President's Medal in 1975 and an honorary doctorate of law in 1989. He also received the Distinguished Service Award of LaGuardia College, recognizing his work with the school in its early years. In the mid-1970s, he was president of both the diocesan Priests' Senate and the Priests' Councils of New York.

Named episcopal vicar for the Queens South Vicariate in 1988 and a monsignor in 1989, he served in that work until 1991 when he was named principal-rector of Cathedral Preparatory Seminary in Elmhurst.

== Bishop ==
On June 28, 1994, Catanello was appointed an Auxiliary Bishop of Brooklyn and Titular Bishop of Deultum by Pope John Paul II. He received his consecration on the following August 22 from Bishop Thomas Daily, with Bishops Joseph Sullivan and René Valero, serving as co-Consecrators, at Our Lady of Perpetual Help Basilica. As an auxiliary bishop, he served as Vicar for Clergy and Vicar for Consecrated Life and Apostolic Organizations. He spent nearly a decade as chairman of the diocesan Ecumenical and Interreligious Commission and was president of the Priests Senate.

It was Catanello's involvement in interfaith and ecumenical activities for a decade as chairman of the diocesan Ecumenical Commission that prepared him for an appointment as a consultant to the United States Conference of Catholic Bishops' Subcommittee on Inter-religious Dialogue. His particular emphasis was on Catholic-Islamic conversations among leaders of both faiths ministering in the Eastern United States.

According to Monsignor Guy Massie, chairperson for the Ecumenical and Inter-Faith Commission for the Roman Catholic Diocese of Brooklyn, Bishop Catanello also had very good relationships with the local Jewish communities of Brooklyn and Queens.

Catanello also served as the episcopal moderator of the National Association of Holy Name Societies, based in Baltimore, Maryland.

Catanello took up residence at Holy Family Parish, Flushing, New York, in 1989 and was appointed as its pastor in 2007. On September 20, 2010, Pope Benedict XVI accepted Catanello's resignation as an active bishop, submitted for reasons of health. At the same time, he retired from Holy Family Parish with the title of Pastor Emeritus.

Catanello died on March 11, 2013, and was buried in the Bishops' Crypt of the Immaculate Conception Center. The Most Reverend Nicholas DiMarzio, Bishop of Brooklyn, praised Bishop Catanello's long service to the Church. “For 47 years, ‘Bishop Iggy’ as so many fondly knew him as, faithfully served the people of the Diocese of Brooklyn....Bishop Catanello's favorite phrase was, ‘OK pal.’ I know that he is OK now.”

== Legacy ==
As a lasting tribute to the bishop, Holy Family parish is installed a new stained-glass window of St. Ignatius of Antioch, the bishop's patron saint, in the sacristy.

The City Of New York announced that it renamed 74th Avenue between 175th Street and Utopia Parkway in Fresh Meadows Bishop Ignatius A. Catanello Way. The ceremony took place June 7 at the Holy Family Church at 175-20 74th Ave. in Fresh Meadows.

Catholic Church titles
Preceded by Yulian Voronovskyi	Titular Bishop of Deultum; 1994–2013	Succeeded by John Rodrigues
Preceded by –	Auxiliary Bishop of Brooklyn; 1994–2010	Succeeded by –
