= Cathedral of St. Ignatius Loyola (Palm Beach Gardens, Florida) =

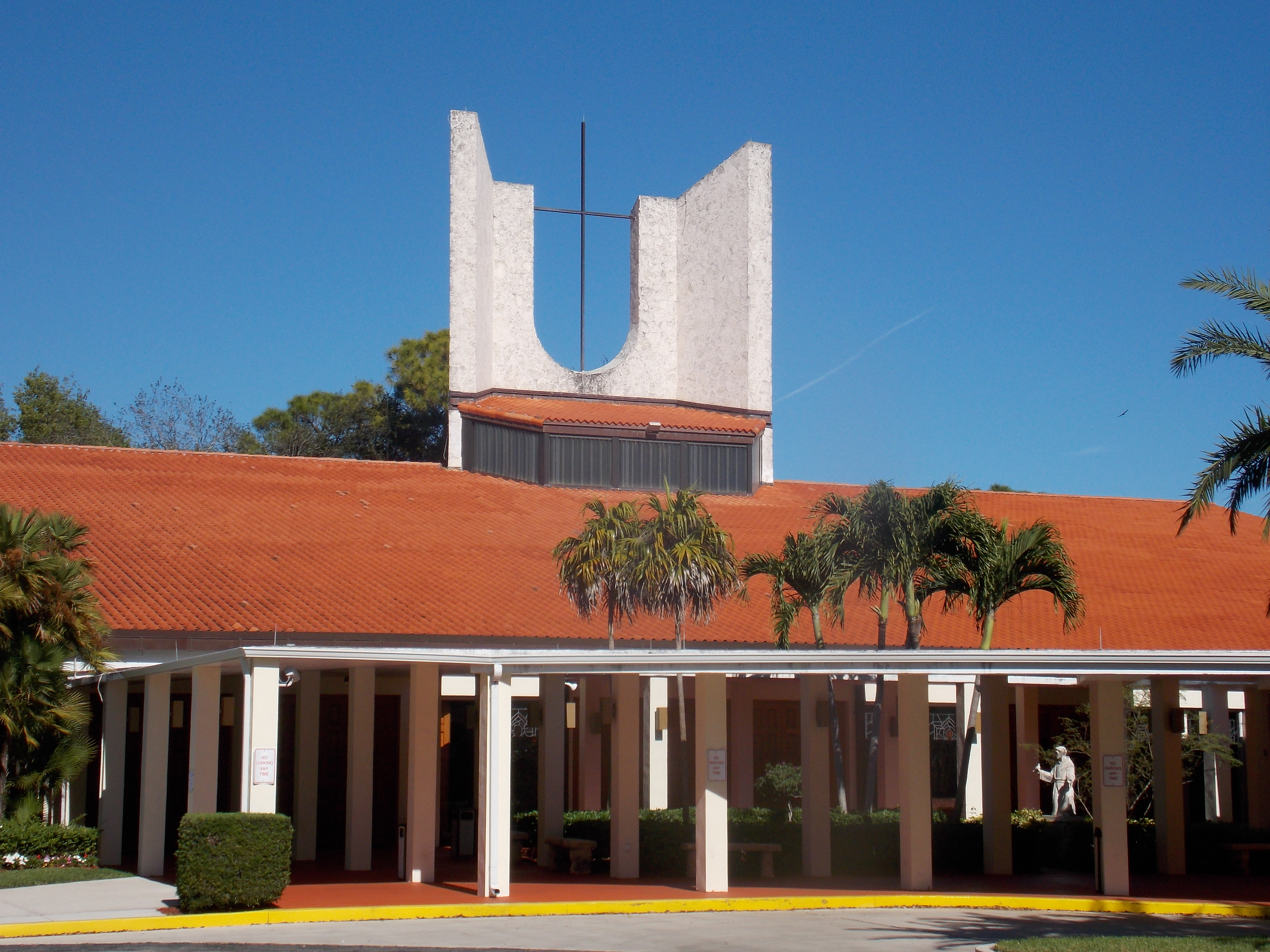

- Location in Florida Cathedral of St. Ignatius Loyola (the United States)
- 26°49′23″N 80°06′25″W
- Location: 9999 North Military Trail; Palm Beach Gardens, Florida
- Country: United States
- Denomination: Roman Catholic Church
- Website: cathedralpb.com

History
- Founded: 1970

Architecture
- Style: Modern
- Completed: 1984

Specifications
- Capacity: 1,250

Administration
- Diocese: Palm Beach

Clergy
- Bishop: Most Rev. Manuel de Jesús Rodríguez
- Rector: Rev. Gavin Badway

The Cathedral of St. Ignatius Loyola is a Catholic cathedral in Palm Beach Gardens, Florida. It is the seat of the Diocese of Palm Beach, which administers to the counties of Palm Beach, Martin, Okeechobee, St. Lucie, and Indian River. The diocese oversees 49 individual parishes.

== History ==
St. Ignatius Loyola was established as a parish of the Archdiocese of Miami on June 25, 1970, by Archbishop Coleman Carroll. The Rev. John Mulcahy was appointed to be the first pastor. The first Mass for the parish was celebrated at Palm Beach Gardens Community High School for less than two dozen people on July 5, 1970. By 1974 there were over 600 families in the parish. Ground was broken in January of that year for a multi-purpose facility. It opened in December and served the parish for ten years. A rectory was built in 1979 and by 1982 the parish had over 2,000 households and plans were made for a new church.

Construction for the present church was begun in 1983. While it was being built Pope John Paul II established the Diocese of Palm Beach on June 16, 1984. St. Ignatius was chosen as the cathedral for the new diocese. The new cathedral church was dedicated by Archbishop Edward A. McCarthy on October 6, 1984. Bishop Thomas V. Daily was installed as the First Bishop of Palm Beach on October 24 of the same year.

== Architecture ==
The Cathedral of St. Ignatius Loyola was built in the Modern architectural style. The pews are arranged on a sloped floor to promote better participation. Together with the chapel the cathedral holds 1,250 people. The sanctuary rises 75 feet (22.9 m) in an inverted arch. The wood reredos and the marble sanctuary furniture was a part of an early 21st-century renovation.

The Diocese of Palm Beach website describes this cathedral was designed to use natural light and the exterior walls are of native Florida coral. The bishop's chair was designed to be the focal point. One of the stained glass windows called "the East Window" covers an entire wall from floor to ceiling. It was designed by Liturgical artist Mario Agustin Locsin y Montenegro.

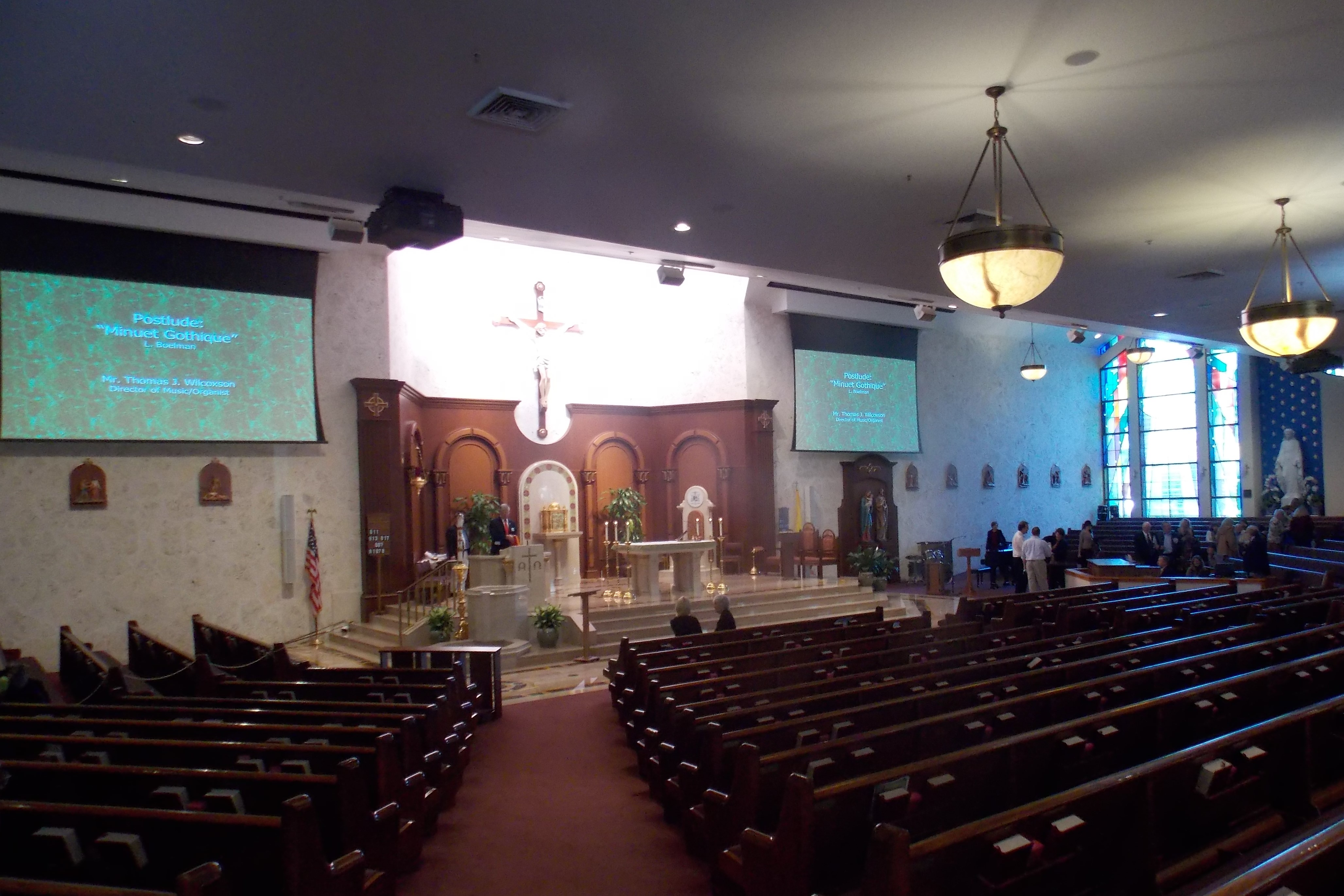
Interior

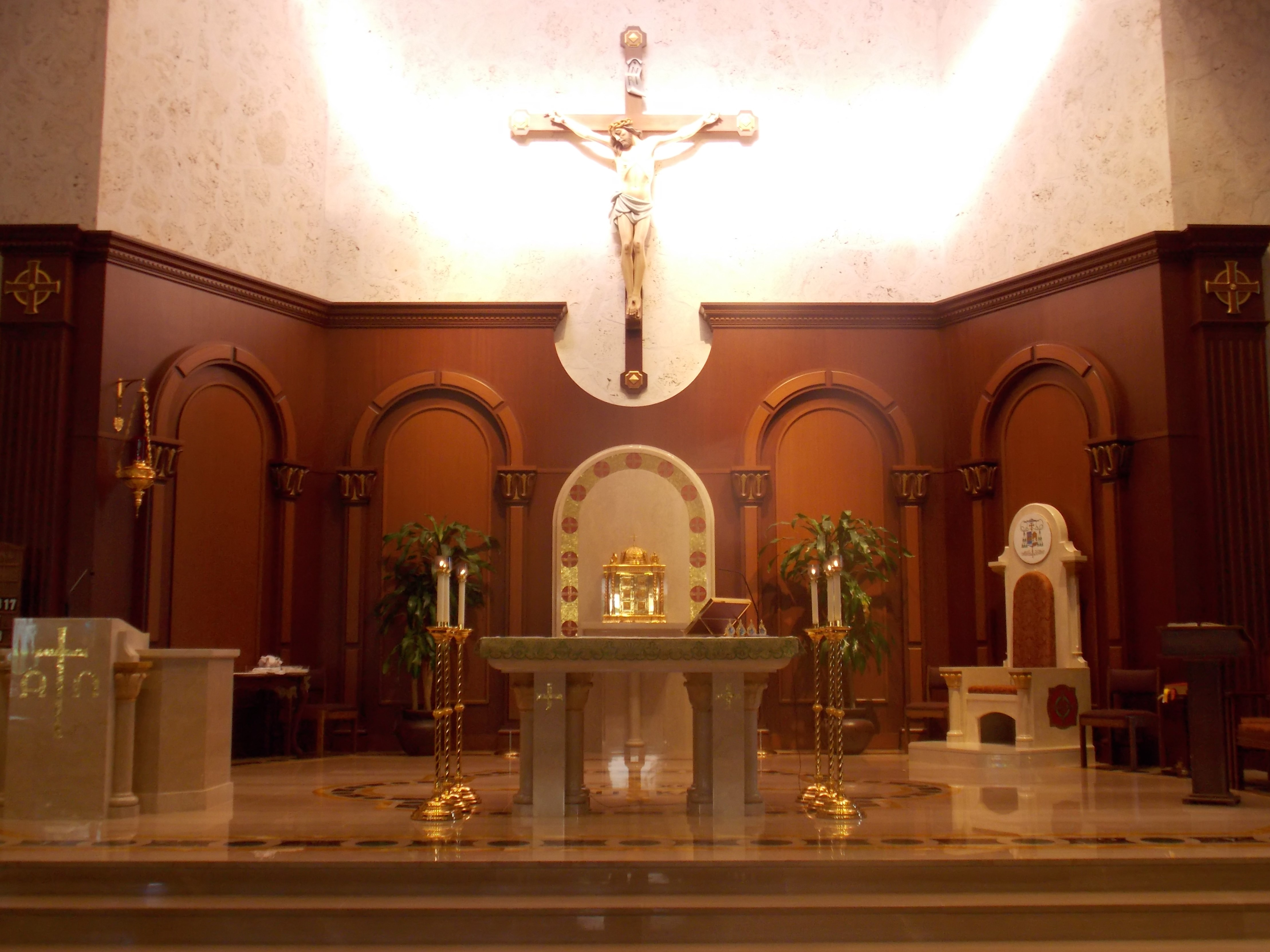
Sanctuary

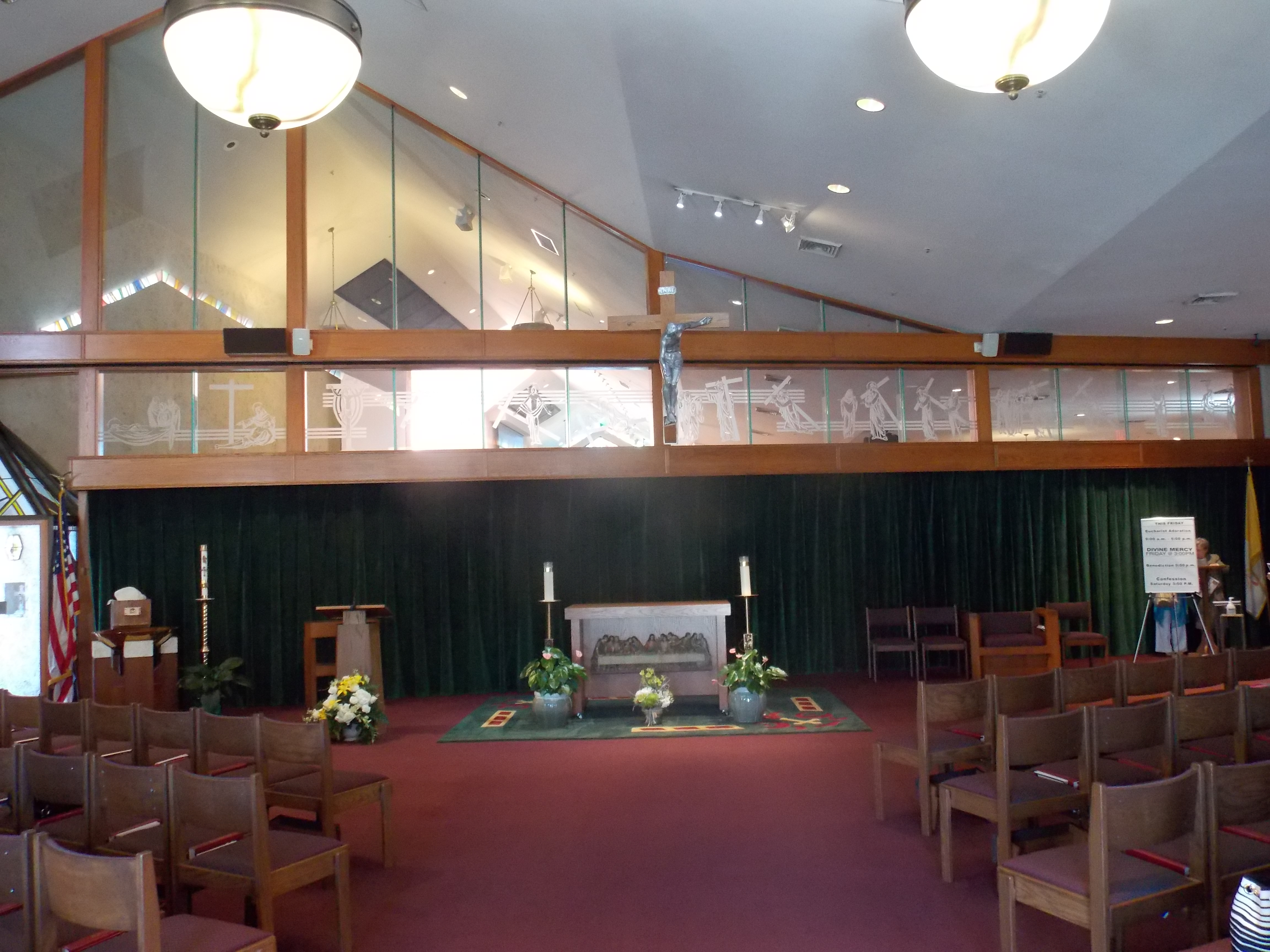
Chapel

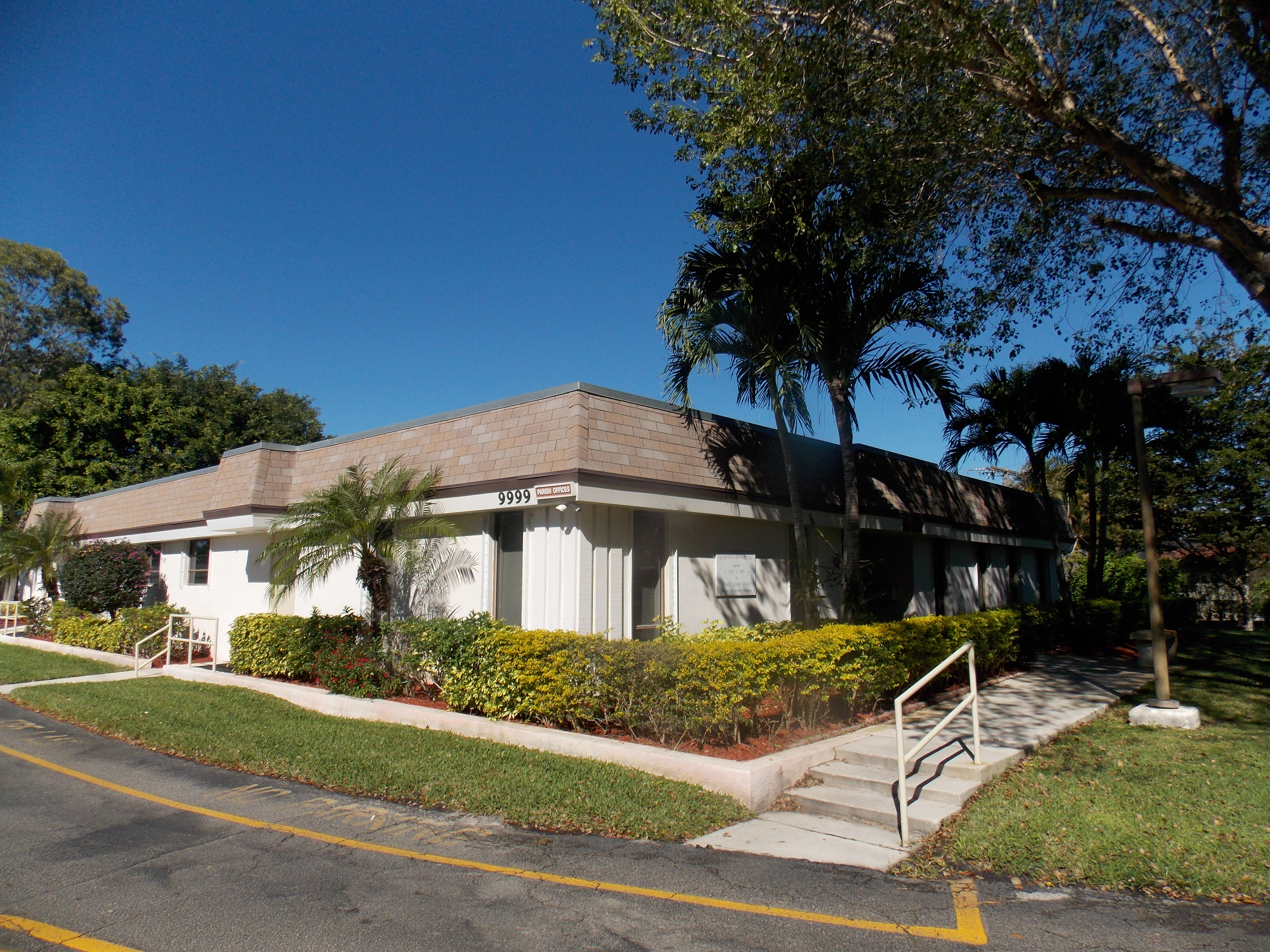
Rectory

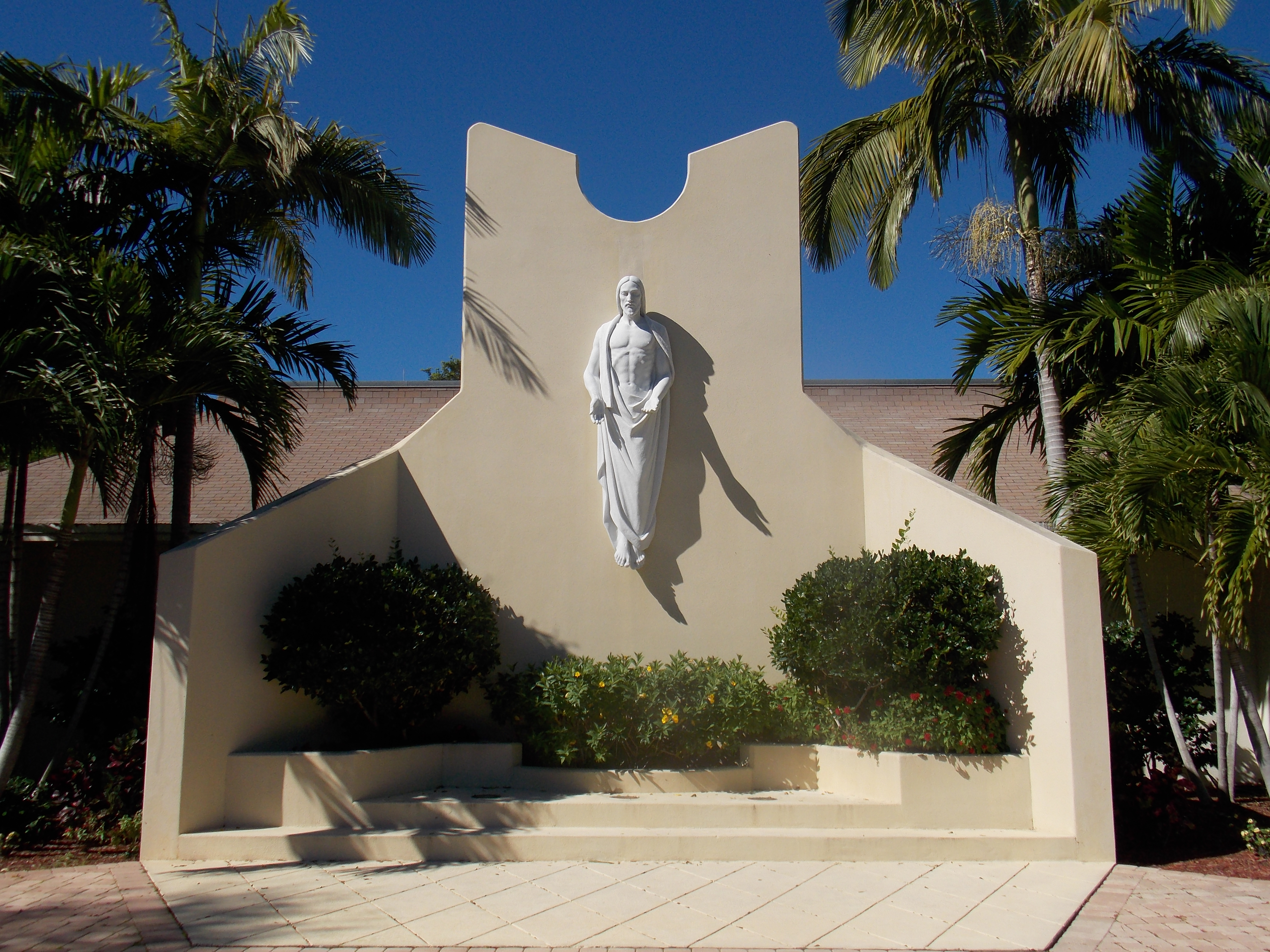
Multi-purpose building

== Pastors and rectors ==
The following priests have served St. Ignatius as its pastor and since 1983 they have been the cathedral rector:

- Rev. John Mulcahy (1970–1976)
- Rev. Francis J. Dunleavy (1976–1978)
- Rev. Frank Flynn (1978–1988)
- Rev. Frank O’Loughlin (1988–1992)
- Rev. James P. Malvey (1992–1996)
- Msgr. Thomas Klinzing (1996–2000)
- Rev. John A. Kasparek (2000–2005)
- Rev. Thomas E. Barrett (2000–2020)
- Rev. Gavin Badway (2020–present)

== See also ==
- List of Catholic cathedrals in the United States
- List of cathedrals in Florida
