= Henchir-El-Djemel =

Henchir-El-Djemel Vicus Turris
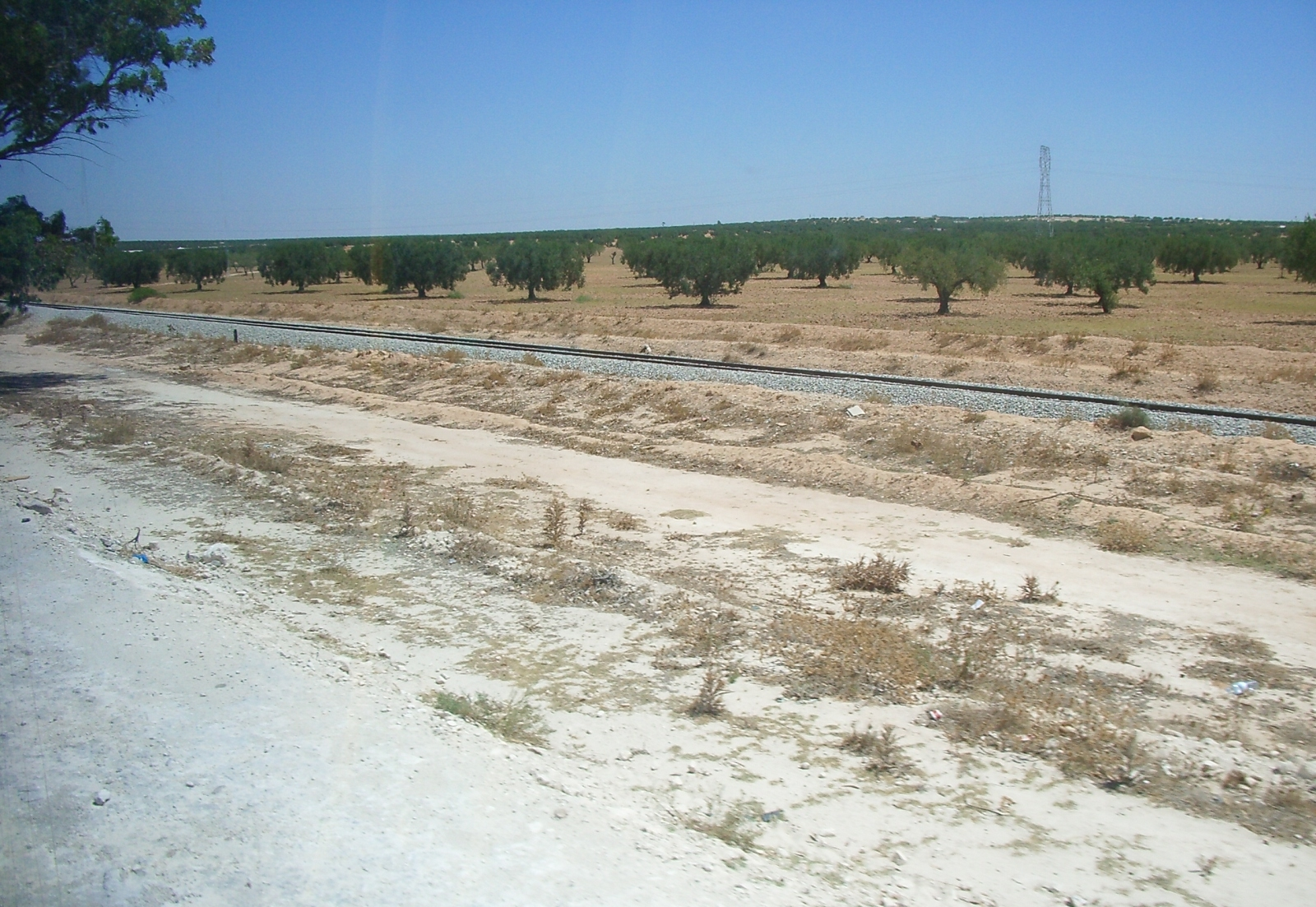
- countryside near Henchir-El-Djemel

- Location within Tunisia
- Coordinates: 34°53′50″N 10°46′51″E
- Country: Tunisia
- Governorates: Sfax Governorate
- Elevation: 17 m (57 ft)
- Postal code: 3000

Henchir-El-Djemel is a village near Sakiet Ezzit in the Gouvernorat of Safaqis, in Tunisia.

== Geography ==
Henchir-El-Djemel is located at 34°53'50" N and 10°46'51" E just north of Sfax. It is situated on a wadi, 7 km from the Mediterranean coast with an elevation of 57 meters above sea level. It is also spelled Hanshīr al Jamal and Henchir el Jemel.

== History ==
Henchir-El-Djemel was the site of a Roman civitas in Africa Proconsulare. It was a Catholic diocese called Vicus Turris. The area is today arid but supports commercial agriculture.
