= Cathedral of St. Thomas More =

Cathedral of St. Thomas More may refer to:

United States

- Cathedral of Saint Thomas More (Arlington, Virginia)
- Co-Cathedral of Saint Thomas More (Tallahassee, Florida)

== See also ==
- List of institutions named after Thomas More
