= Vicus Turris =

Henchir-El-Djemel Vicus Turris
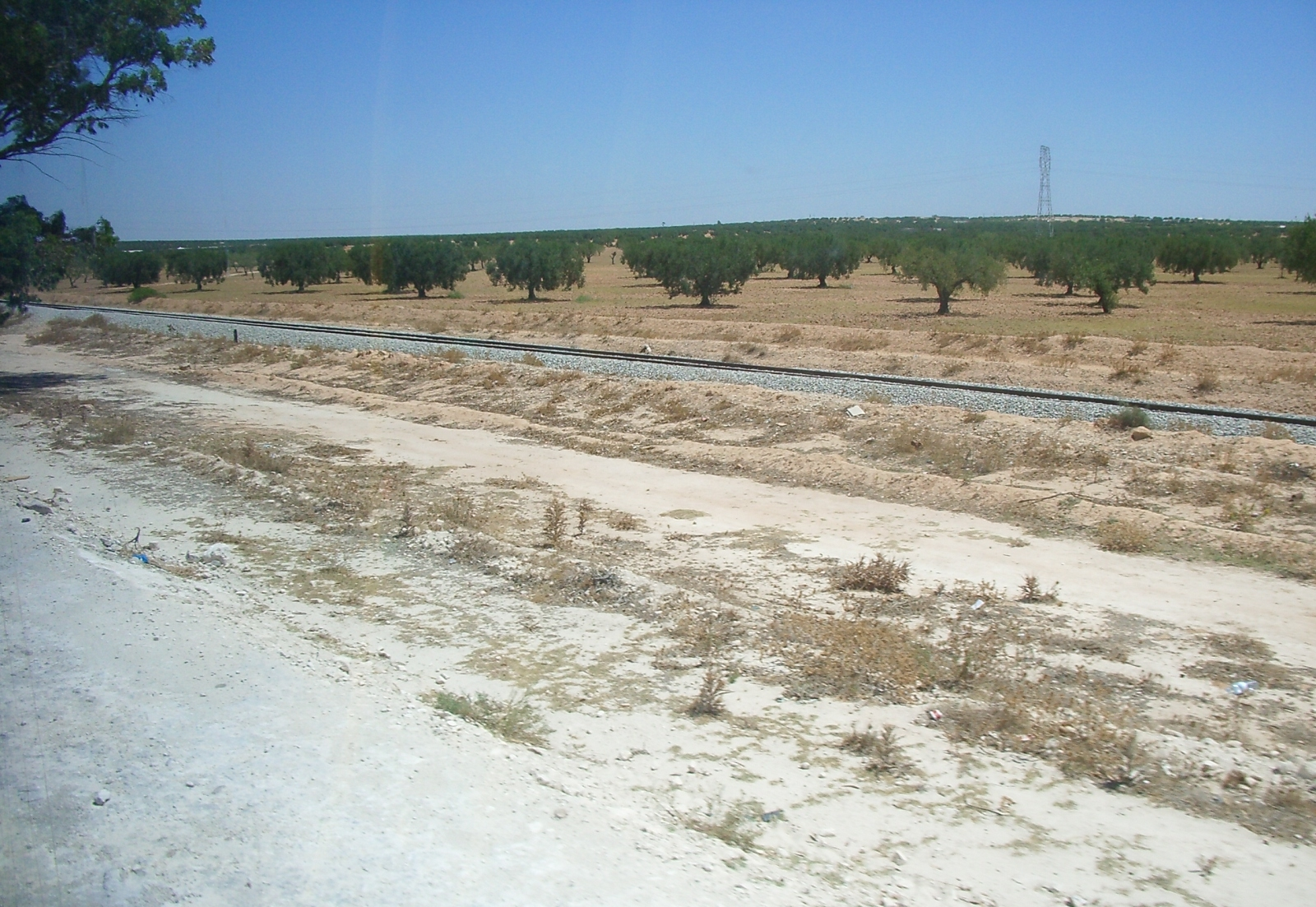
- countryside near Henchir-El-Djemel

- Location within Tunisia
- Coordinates: 34°44′N 10°46′E
- Country: Tunisia
- Governorates: Sfax Governorate
- Elevation: 17 m (57 ft)
- Postal code: 3000

Vicus Turris is a former Roman and Byzantine town of Africa and a titular see of the Roman Catholic Church.

The town is identified with modern Henchir-El-Djemel, near Sakiet Ezzit in the Gouvernorat of Safaqis, Tunisia (North Africa). Henchir-El-Djemel is located at 34°53'50" N and 10°46'51" E just north of Sfax. It is situated on a wadi, 7 km from the Mediterranean coast with an elevation of 57 meters above sea level. Hennchir el Djemel is also known as Hanshīr al Jamal, and Henchir el Jemel.
