= John Carroll Catholic High School (Florida) =

John Carroll High School

Location
- 3402 Delaware Avenue; Fort Pierce, (St. Lucie County), Florida 34947; United States; 27°26′40″N 80°21′38″W

Information
- Type: Private, Coeducational
- Religious affiliation: Roman Catholic
- Established: 1965; 61 years ago
- CEEB code: 100527
- NCES School ID: 02159443
- President: Corey Heroux
- Principal: Michael Bryk
- Teaching staff: 32 (on an FTE basis)
- Grades: 9–12
- Enrollment: 465 (2024-2025)
- Student to teacher ratio: 17.8
- Campus: Large suburb
- Colors: Blue and Gold
- Mascot: The Golden Ram
- Team name: Golden Rams
- Accreditation: Southern Association of Colleges and Schools
- Tuition: Catholic tuition-$11,950 Non-Catholic Tuition-$12,950
- Athletic Director: Mickey Groody
- Website: www.johncarrollhigh.com

John Carroll High School, located in Fort Pierce, Florida, is a co-ed Catholic high school serving over 465 students in grades 9-12.

== History ==
The school originally opened as part of St. Anastasia Catholic School and opened under the name John Carroll High School in 1965 as Diocesan regional high school. It is part of the Roman Catholic Diocese of Palm Beach.

The school serves students from Indian River, St. Lucie, Martin, and Okeechobee counties. It is accredited by Southern Association of Colleges and Schools and holds membership in the National Catholic Education Association.

== Academics ==
John Carroll offers Advanced Placement, dual enrollment, honors, and college prep classes. Eight dual enrollment classes are offered on campus through a partnership with Indian River State College, and students can also elect to take additional dual enrollment classes off campus.

== Notable alumni ==
- Chase Solesky, baseball pitcher
