= List of cathedrals in Florida =

This is a list of cathedrals in Florida, United States:

Municipality	Cathedral	Image	Location & References
Coral Gables (Miami area)	St. George Cathedral (Antiochian Orthodox)		25°44′43″N 80°15′41″W
Jacksonville	St. John's Cathedral (Episcopal)		30°19′44″N 81°39′12″W
Miami	St. Mary's Cathedral (Roman Catholic)		25°50′38″N 80°12′01″W
Miami	Trinity Cathedral (Episcopal)		25°47′25″N 80°11′12″W
Miami	St. Sophia Cathedral (Greek Orthodox)		25°45′22″N 80°12′23″W
Miami	St. Peter's Cathedral (African Orthodox) (not in communion with the Ecumenical Patriarch)		25°49′14″N 80°11′59″W
Miami Lakes (Miami area)	Christ the Saviour Cathedral (Orthodox Church in America)		25°55′27″N 80°19′30″W
Miramar (Miami area)	Resurrection Cathedral (Charismatic Episcopal Church)		25°59′18″N 80°13′18″W
Orlando	St. James Cathedral (Roman Catholic)		28°32′42″N 81°22′43″W
Orlando	St. Luke's Cathedral (Episcopal)		28°32′40″N 81°22′40″W
Orlando	Cathedral of St. Dismas (Charismatic Episcopal Church)		28°34′09″N 81°25′48″W
Oviedo (Orlando area)	St. Alban's Cathedral (Anglican Province of America)		28°37′09″N 81°15′19″W
Palm Beach Gardens	St. Ignatius Loyola Cathedral (Roman Catholic)		26°49′23″N 80°06′25″W
Pensacola	Sacred Heart Cathedral (Roman Catholic)		30°25′56″N 87°12′15″W
St. Augustine	Cathedral Basilica of St. Augustine (Roman Catholic)		29°53′35″N 81°18′45″W
St. Petersburg	St. Jude the Apostle Cathedral (Roman Catholic)		27°46′40″N 82°42′48″W
St. Petersburg	St. Peter's Cathedral (Episcopal)		27°46′24″N 82°38′20″W
Tallahassee	St. Thomas More Co-Cathedral (Roman Catholic)		30°26′48″N 84°17′52″W
Tallahassee	St. Peter's Cathedral (Anglican)		30°32′02″N 84°14′00″W
Tampa	Cathedral of Jesus of Nazareth (Philippine Independent Church)		28°04′40″N 82°28′05″W
Tarpon Springs	St. Nicholas Greek Orthodox Cathedral (Greek Orthodox)		28°08′49″N 82°45′23″W
Venice	Epiphany Cathedral (Roman Catholic)		27°06′04″N 82°26′56″W

== See also ==
- List of cathedrals in the United States
