= Chase Solesky =

American baseball player (born 1997)

Cincinnati Reds
- Pitcher
- Born: September 26, 1997 (age 29); Fort Pierce, Florida, U.S.
- Bats: Right Throws: Right

MLB debut
- May 18, 2026, for the Tampa Bay Rays

MLB statistics (through 2026 season)
- Win–loss record: 0–0
- Earned run average: 6.00
- Strikeouts: 4
- Stats at Baseball Reference

Teams
- Tampa Bay Rays (2026)

Chase David Solesky (born September 26, 1997) is an American professional baseball pitcher for the Cincinnati Reds of Major League Baseball (MLB). He has previously played in MLB for the Tampa Bay Rays.

== Amateur career ==
Solesky attended John Carroll Catholic High School and played college baseball at Tulane University. As a junior with Tulane, he posted a 6–4 win–loss record with a 5.13 earned run average (ERA) and 70 strikeouts in the 2019 season. He was selected by the Chicago White Sox in the 21st round, 620th overall, of the 2019 Major League Baseball draft.

== Professional career ==
=== Chicago White Sox ===
Solesky made his professional debut in 2019 with the Great Falls Voyagers, posting a 6.17 ERA with 45 strikeouts in 13 games. He did not play in a game in 2020 due to the cancellation of the minor league season because of the COVID-19 pandemic. Solesky returned to action in 2021 with the Single–A Kannapolis Cannon Ballers and High–A Winston-Salem Dash. He made 18 starts for the two affiliates, recording a 5.14 ERA with 88 strikeouts across 68 1/3 innings pitched. He split the 2022 season with High-A Winston-Salem and the Double-A Birmingham Barons, pitching to a 4.10 ERA with 88 strikeouts. In 2023 with Double-A Birmingham and the Triple-A Charlotte Knights, Solesky logged a 5–11 record and 5.31 ERA. He was released by the White Sox organization prior to the start of the 2024 season.

=== Hagerstown Flying Boxcars ===
Prior to the 2024 season, Solesky signed with the Hagerstown Flying Boxcars of the Atlantic League of Professional Baseball. In nine games, he posted a 3–4 record with a 6.48 ERA and 29 strikeouts.

=== Washington Nationals ===
On June 10, 2024, Solesky signed a minor-league contract with the Washington Nationals organization. In 2024, he made 17 appearances for the Double-A Harrisburg Senators, recording a 3.02 ERA with 51 strikeouts across 83 1/3 innings pitched. Solesky spent the 2025 season with the Triple-A Rochester Red Wings, pitching to a 5.28 ERA with 96 strikeouts.

=== Tampa Bay Rays ===
On January 15, 2026, Solesky signed a minor-league contract with the Tampa Bay Rays organization. He began the 2026 season with the Triple–A Durham Bulls, starting six contests and registering a 6.57 ERA with 27 strikeouts across 24 2/3 innings pitched. On May 5, Solesky was selected to Tampa Bay's 40-man roster and promoted to the major leagues for the first time. He did not make an appearance and was optioned to Triple-A Durham on May 8, becoming a phantom ballplayer. On May 18, Solesky was recalled to Tampa Bay. He debuted that day, allowing two runs on six hits with four strikeouts across three innings of relief against the Baltimore Orioles. Solesky was designated for assignment by Tampa Bay on August 3, following the team's acquisition of Tyler Wells.

=== Cincinnati Reds ===
On August 6, 2026, Solesky was claimed off of waivers by the Cincinnati Reds.
