= Diocese of Palm Beach =

Latin Catholic ecclesiastical jurisdiction in Florida, USA

Coordinates: 26°42′54″N 80°02′22″W

Diocese of Palm Beach Dioecesis Litoris Palmensis
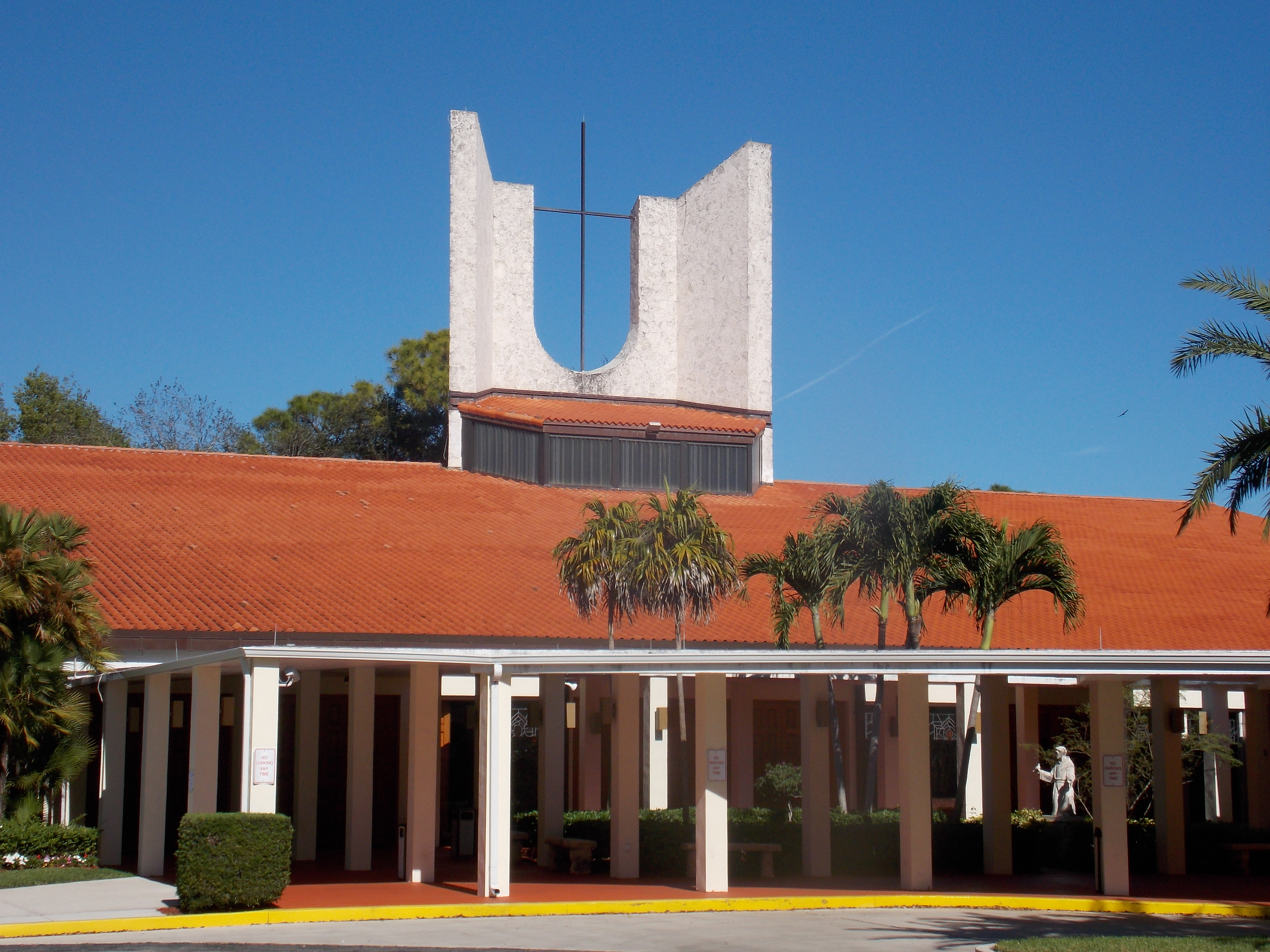
- Cathedral of St. Ignatius Loyola

- Coat of arms

Location
- Country: United States
- Territory: Five counties in eastern Florida
- Ecclesiastical province: Miami

Statistics
- Population: Total; Catholics: (as of 2022); 2,211,148; 233,244 (10.5%)

Information
- Denomination: Catholic
- Sui iuris church: Latin Church
- Rite: Roman Rite
- Established: June 16, 1984
- Cathedral: Cathedral of St. Ignatius Loyola
- Patron saint: Our Lady, Queen of the Apostles

Current leadership
- Pope: Leo XIV
- Bishop: Manuel de Jesús Rodríguez
- Metropolitan Archbishop: Thomas Wenski
- Bishops emeritus: Gerald Michael Barbarito; Joseph Keith Symons

Map
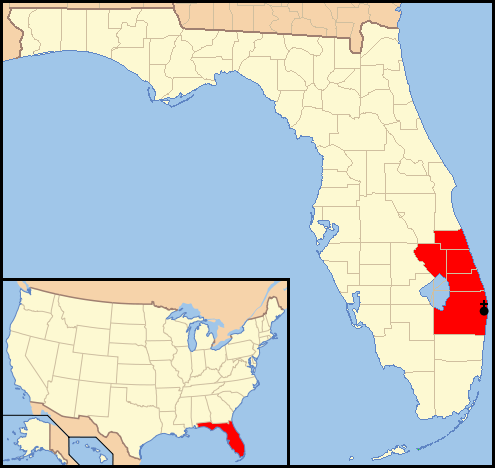

Website
- diocesepb.org

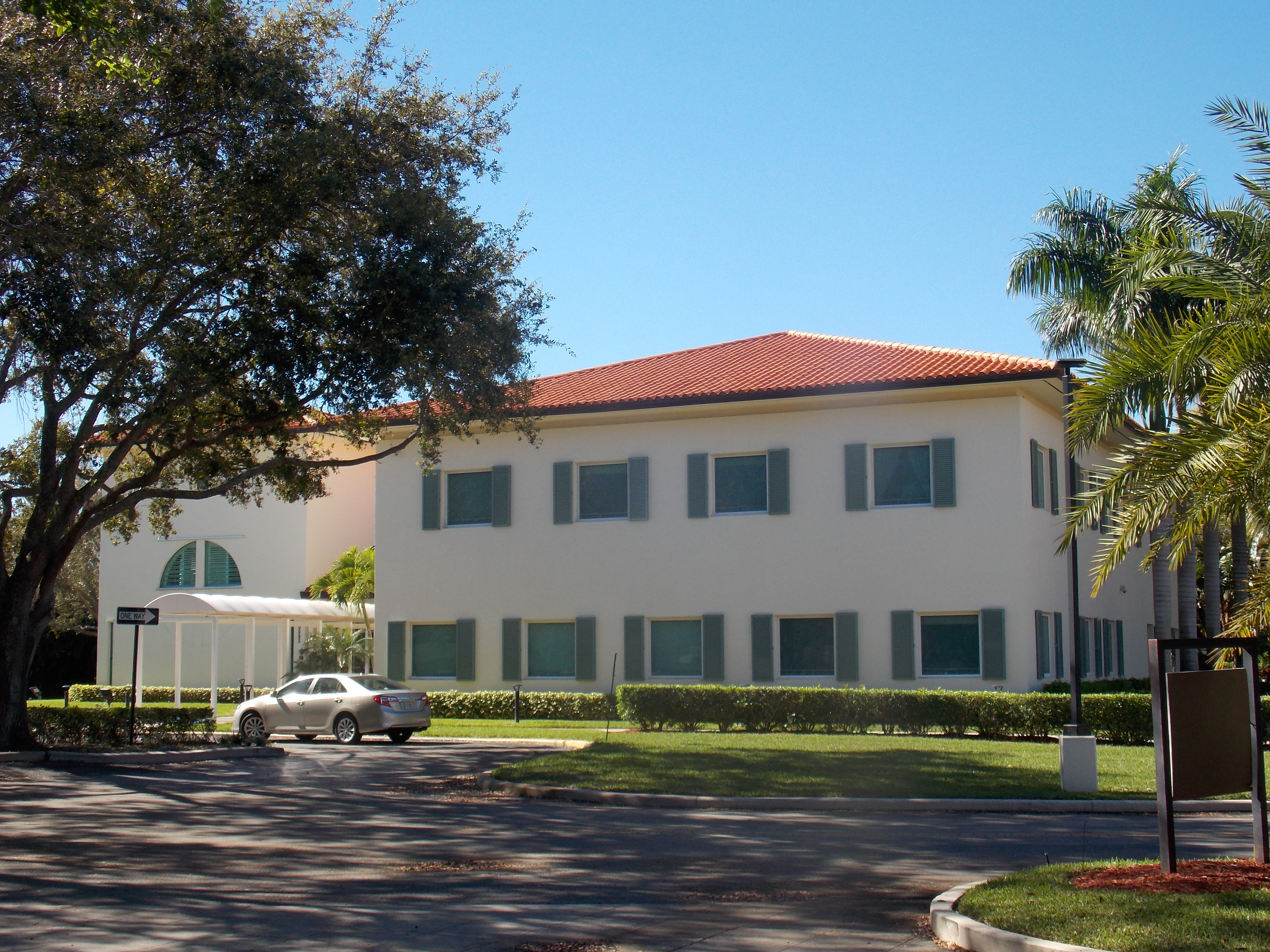
Diocesan Pastoral Center, Palm Beach (2015)

The Diocese of Palm Beach (Latin: Dioecesis Litoris Palmensis) is diocese of the Catholic Church in eastern Florida in the United States The patron saint of the diocese is Mary, mother of Jesus, under the title Queen of the Apostles. The Diocese of Palm Beach is a suffragan diocese of the Archdiocese of Miami.

== Statistics ==
The Diocese of Palm Beach serves Catholics in parishes and missions across five counties in southeastern Florida: Palm Beach, Martin, St. Lucie, Indian River, Okeechobee.

== History ==
=== 1500 to1800 ===
The first Catholic presence in the Palm Beach area was the presidio of Santa Lucia, established by Spanish soldiers somewhere around Jupiter Bay 1565. Facing attacks from the Jaegas peoples and running low on supplies, the Spanish abandoned the fort after three months.

By 1606, Spanish Florida was under the jurisdiction of the Diocese of Santiago de Cuba (until 1787, later of the Diocese of Havana in Cuba). After the end of the French and Indian War in 1763, Spain ceded all of Florida to Great Britain for the return of Cuba. Given the antagonism of Protestant Great Britain to Catholicism, the majority of the Catholic population in Florida fled to Cuba. After the American Revolution ended in 1783, Spain regained control of Florida from Great Britain in 1784.

In 1793, the Vatican changed the jurisdiction for Florida Catholics from Havana to the Apostolic Vicariate of Louisiana and the Two Floridas, based in New Orleans.

=== 1800 to 1900 ===
After of the Louisiana purchase (1803), in 1806 Florida returned to the Diocese of Havana (until 1823). In the Adams–Onís Treaty of 1819, Spain ceded all of Florida to the United States, which established the Florida Territory in 1821. In 1825, Pope Leo XII erected the Vicariate of Alabama and Florida, which included all of Florida, based in Mobile Alabama. In 1858, Pius IX moved Florida into a new Apostolic Vicariate of Florida, which in 1870, was elevated into the Diocese of St. Augustine. The new diocese covered all of Florida except for the Florida Panhandle region.

Bishop John Moore of St. Augustine asked the Society of Jesus in 1889 to assume jurisdiction over all of South Florida. The Jesuits then sent Conrad M. Widman to West Palm Beach in 1892 to serve as its first priest. He founded St. Ann Parish, the first parish in the diocese. The land for the church was donated by the developer Henry Flagler.

=== 1900 to 1980 ===
In 1910, the first Catholic parish in Fort Pierce, Saint Anastasia, was founded. Six years later, the St. Joseph Mission was established in Stuart. The first Catholic parish in Indian River County was St. Helen, founded in 1919 in Vero Beach.

By 1930, five parishes had been erected in the area. The Franciscan Sisters of Allegany in 1938 opened St. Mary's Hospital in West Palm Beach. It is today St. Mary's Medical Center. The first parish in Boca Raton, St. Joan of Arc, was erected in 1956.

The Vincentian Fathers in 1963 established the St. Vincent de Paul Regional Seminary in Boynton Beach, which would later by used by all the Florida dioceses. St. Lucie Catholic Church was dedicated in Port Saint Lucie in 1964, the first Catholic church in that community.

When the Vatican elevated the Diocese of Miami to the Archdiocese of Miami in 1968, it moved Palm Beach and Martin Counties from the Diocese of St. Augustine. St. Ignatius Loyola Parish was founded in 1970 in Palm Beach Gardens. It would later become the Cathedral of St. Ignatius Parish.

=== 1980 to 2000 ===
Pope John Paul II established the Diocese of Palm Beach on June 16, 1984, taking its territory from the Archdiocese of Miami and the Diocese of Orlando. He appointed Auxiliary Bishop Thomas Daily of the Archdiocese of Boston as the first bishop of Palm Beach. Also in 1984, Daily established the Catholic Charities of the Diocese of Palm Beach as the social services arm of the diocese.

Among Daily's most noteworthy actions were the leading of anti-abortion prayers vigils at local women's health clinics. In February 1990, John Paul II selected Daily to serve as bishop of the Diocese of Brooklyn.

In June 1990, Bishop Joseph Symons of the Diocese of Pensacola-Tallahassee was named by John Paul II as the second bishop of Palm Beach. In 1991, Symons authorized the taping of an exorcism for TV broadcast. The rite was performed by James J. LeBar and other priests on a 16-year-old girl identified as "Gina." Footage of the exorcism was then aired on ABC's 20/20 TV program. In allowing the taping, Symons said that he hoped it would help "counteract diabolical activities around us."

By 1995, the diocese had a Catholic population of approximately 200,000 in 46 parishes and five missions.After Symons resigned as bishop of Palm Beach in June 1998, John Paul II appointed Anthony O'Connell of the Diocese of Knoxville as bishop of Palm Beach in November 1998.

=== 2000 to present ===
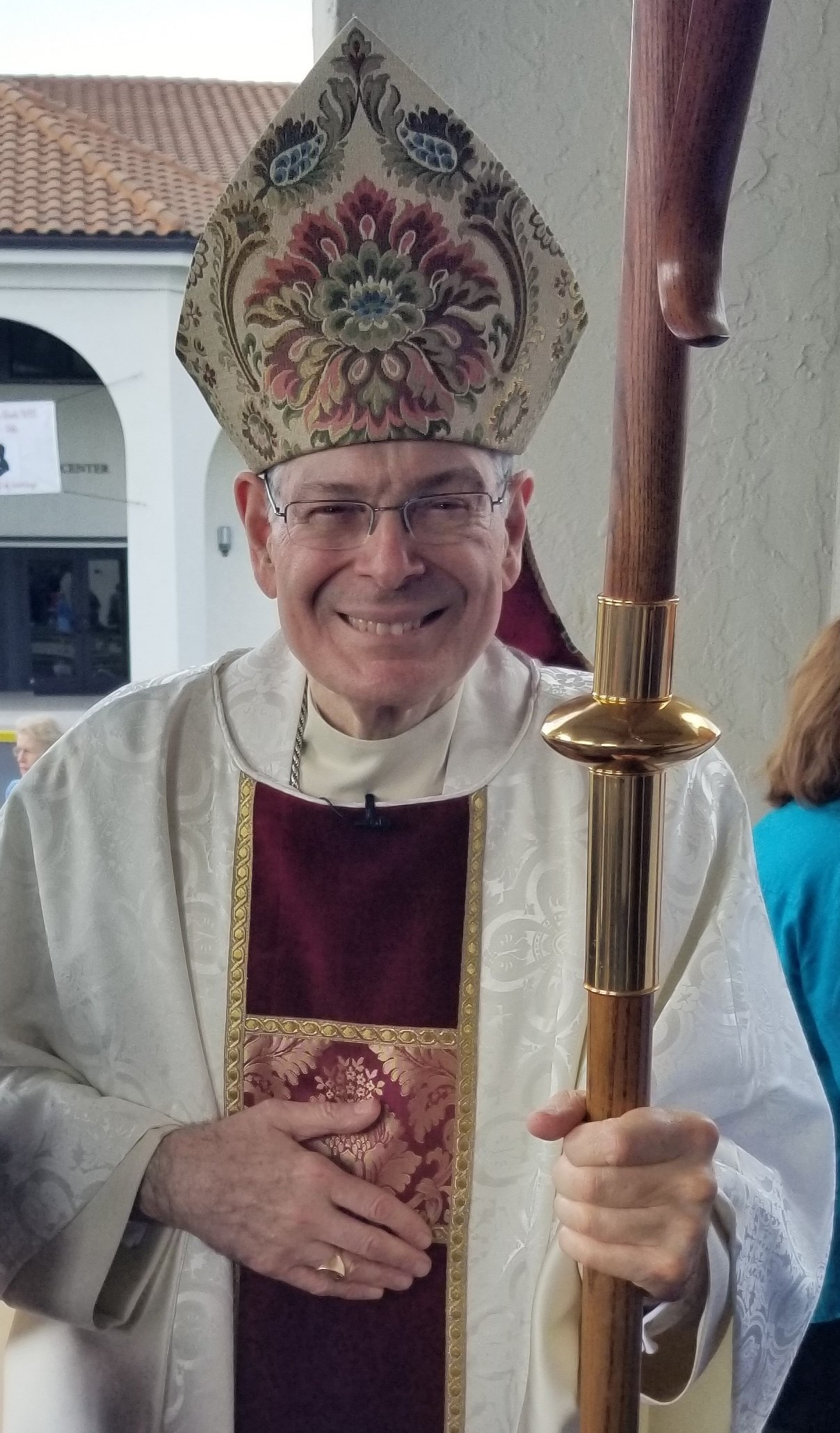
Bishop Barbarito (2023)

O'Connell resigned as bishop of Palm Beach in March 2002.John Paul II named Bishop Seán O'Malley of the Diocese of Fall River as the new bishop of Palm Beach in September 2002. After less than a year in Palm Beach, the pope appointed O'Malley as archbishop of Boston. Bishop Gerald Barbarito of the Diocese of Ogdensburg was named by John Paul as bishop in 2003.

Barbarito retired as bishop of Palm Beach in December 2025. Pope Leo XIV that same month selected Manuel de Jesús Rodríguez of Brooklyn to replace Barbarito.

=== Sex abuse ===
In April 1998, a man informed Archbishop John C. Favalora that Symons had sexually abused him when he was an altar server decades earlier. Symons admitted his guilt. In June 1998, Lynch announced that John Paul II had accepted Symons' resignation as bishop of Palm Beach and named an apostolic administrator of the diocese.

On March 8, 2002, O'Connell admitted that he had abused at least two students at St. Thomas Aquinas Preparatory Seminary in Hannibal, Missouri, during his career there. That same day, O'Connell offered his resignation to the Vatican, and Pope John Paul II accepted it on March 13, 2002.

Police in September 2002 arrested Elias F. Guimaraes, a Delray Beach priest, for soliciting sex from a minor. Guimaraes had arranged online to meet a teenage boy at the beach, but he was arrested there in a police sting operation. He pleaded guilty in federal court in January 2003 and was sentenced to 51 months in prison. Guimaraes was deported to Brazil after his release from prison.

In January 2015, Jose Palimattom, a West Palm Beach priest, was arrested for possessing child pornography and showing images to a 14-year-old boy. Arresting officers discovered 40 pornographic images of preteen boys on the priest's phone. Palimattom was convicted, sentenced to six months in jail and deported to India after his release.

== Bishops ==
=== Bishops of Palm Beach ===
1. Thomas Vose Daily (1984–1990), appointed Bishop of Brooklyn
2. Joseph Keith Symons (1990–1998)
  - Robert Nugent Lynch, Bishop of St. Petersburg (apostolic administrator 1998–1999.)
3. Anthony Joseph O'Connell (1999–2002)
4. Seán Patrick O'Malley, OFM Cap. (2002–2003), appointed Archbishop of Boston (elevated to Cardinal in 2006)
5. Gerald Michael Barbarito (2003–2025)
6. Manuel de Jesús Rodríguez (2026–present)

== Education ==
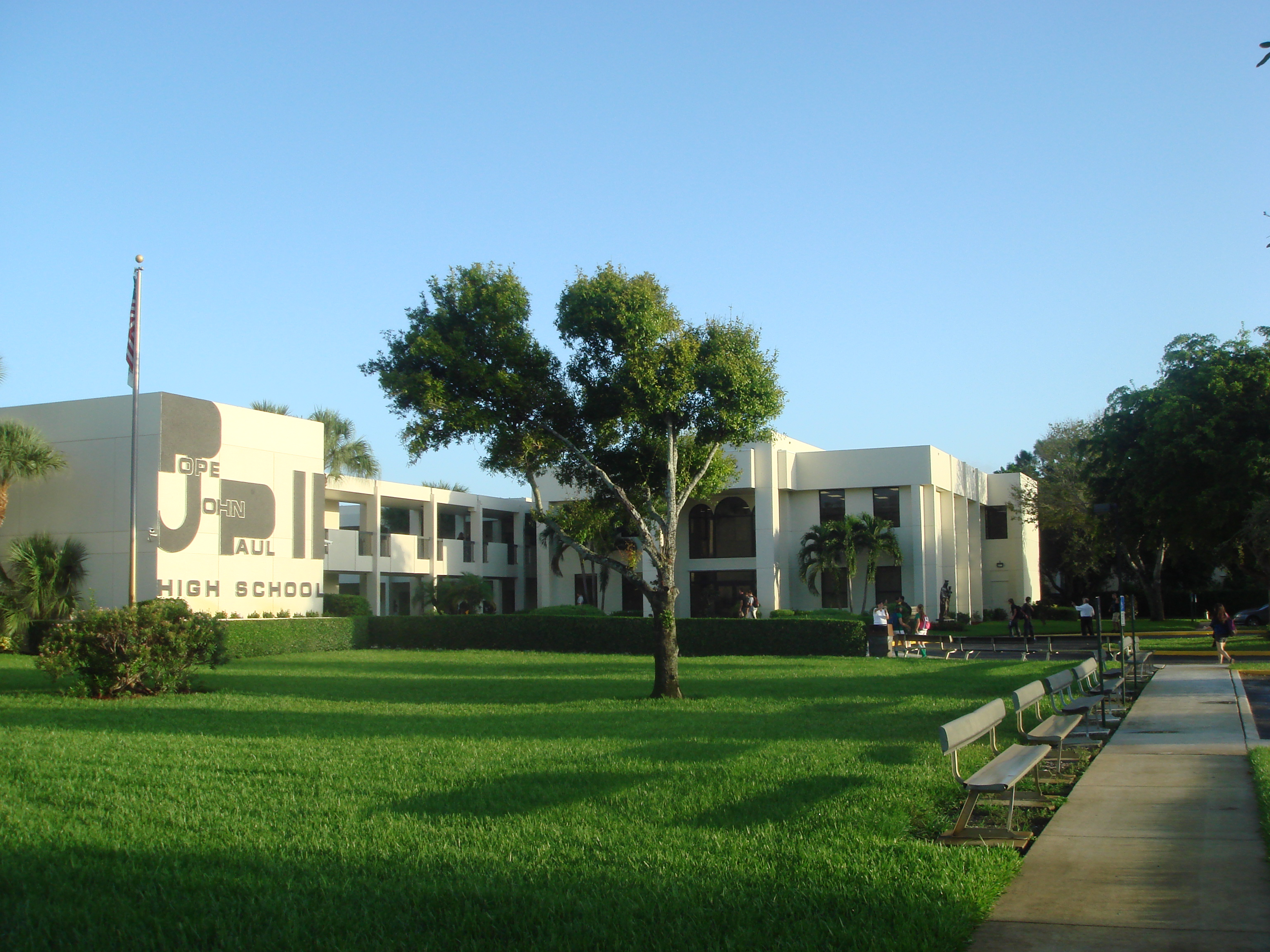
Saint John Paul II Academy (2009)

As of 2026, the Diocese of Palm Beach had two private schools, three high schools, three pre-schoolls and 12 elemenary schools.

=== High schools ===
- Cardinal Newman High School – West Palm Beach
- John Carroll Catholic High School – Fort Pierce
- Saint John Paul II Academy – Boca Raton
