= Diocese of Pensacola–Tallahassee =

Latin Catholic ecclesiastical jurisdiction in Florida, USA

Diocese of Pensacola–Tallahassee Dioecesis Pensacolensis–Tallahassiensis
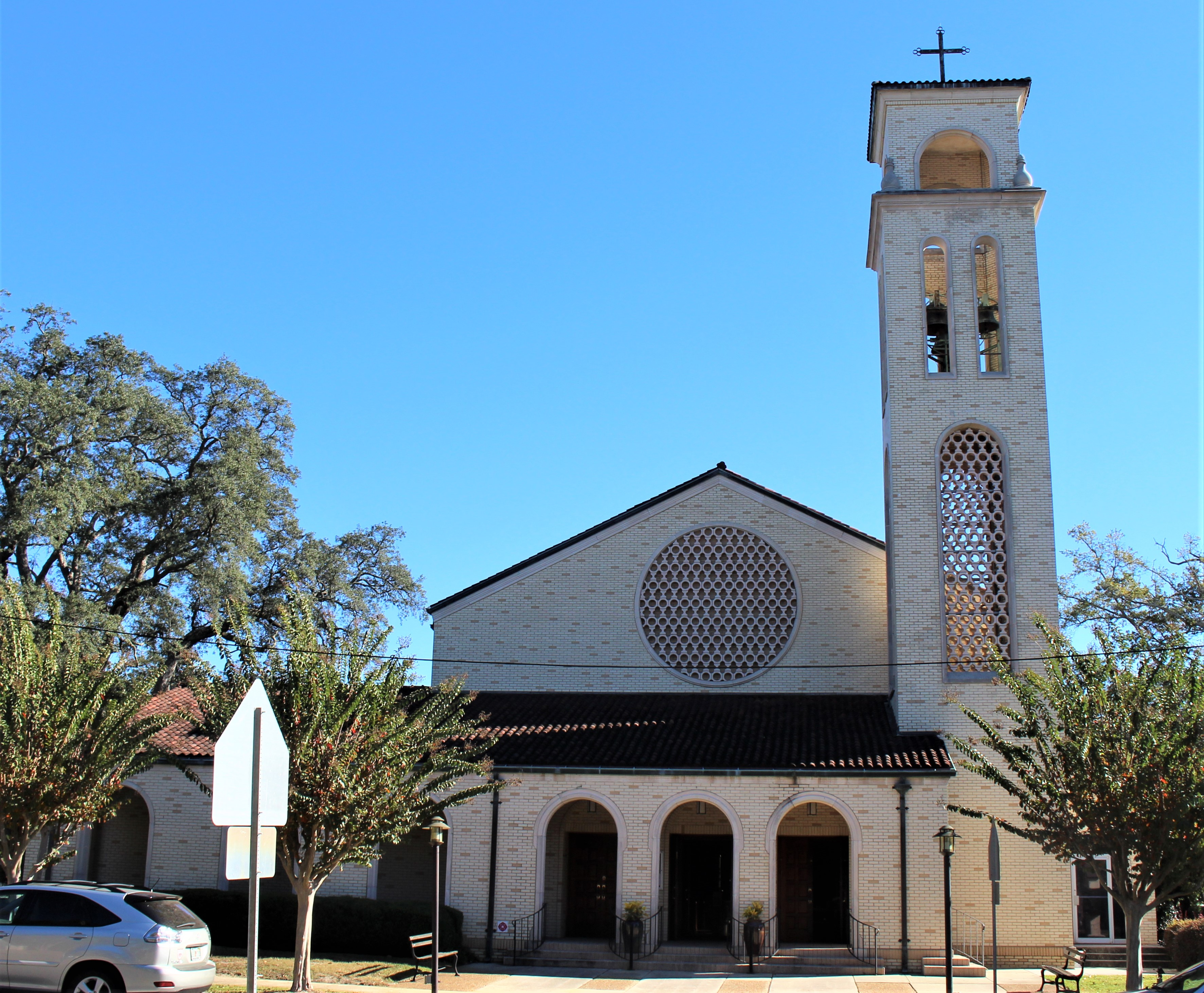
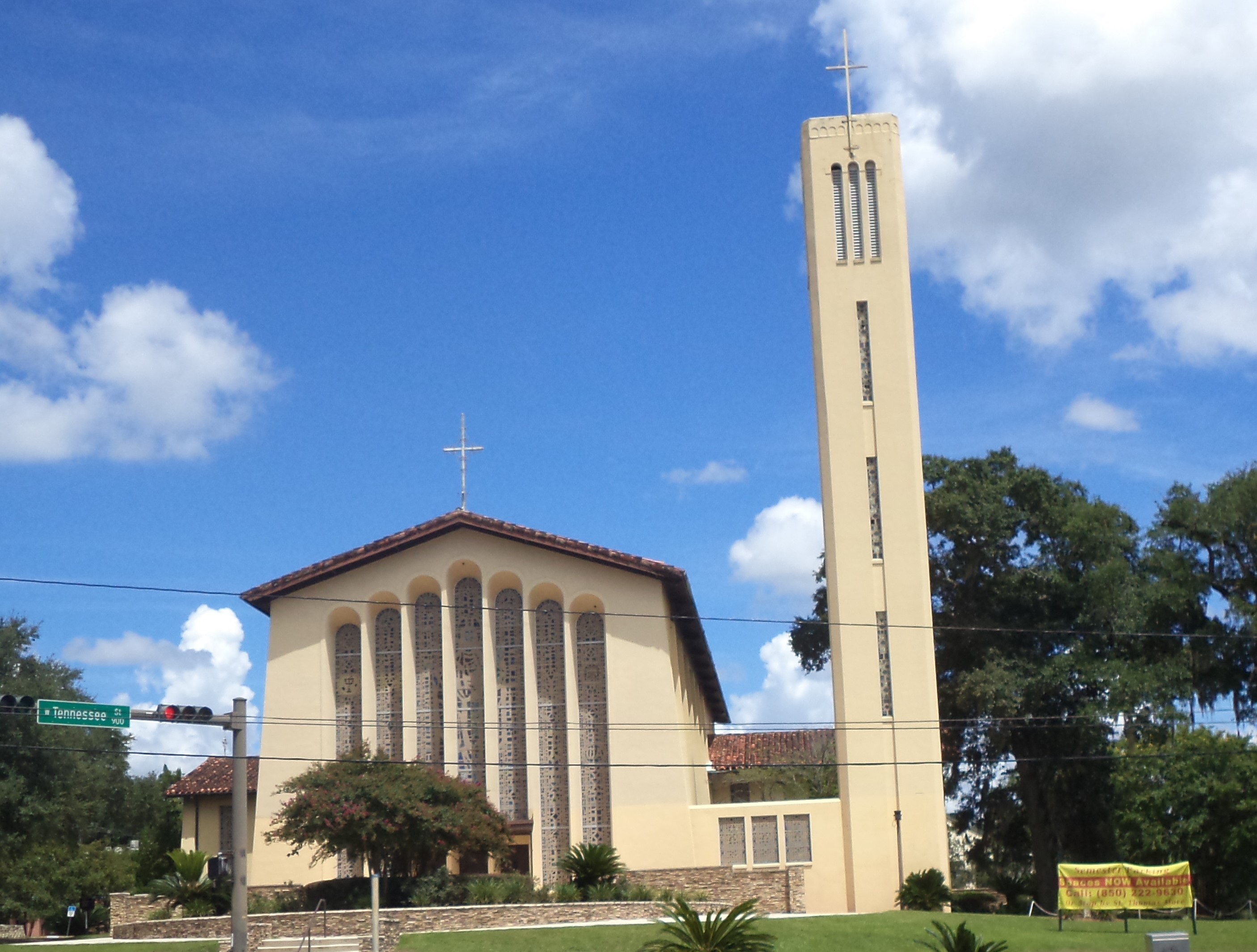
- Cathedral of the Sacred Heart in Pensacola Co-Cathedral of Saint Thomas More in Tallahassee

- Coat of arms

Location
- Country: United States
- Territory: 18 counties in northwest Florida
- Ecclesiastical province: Miami
- Coordinates: 30°26′N 87°12′W

Statistics
- Area: 14,044 sq mi (36,370 km^{2})
- Population: Total; Catholics: (as of 2022); 1,546,239; 71,445 (4.6%)
- Parishes: 53 (3 missions)
- Schools: 10

Information
- Denomination: Catholic
- Sui iuris church: Latin Church
- Rite: Roman Rite
- Established: November 6, 1975 (51 years ago)
- Cathedral: Cathedral of the Sacred Heart (Pensacola)
- Co-cathedral: Co-Cathedral of Saint Thomas More (Tallahassee)
- Patron saint: St. Michael the Archangel (Primary); St. Thomas More and; St. Elizabeth Ann Seton (Secondary)

Current leadership
- Pope: Leo XIV
- Bishop: William Albert Wack
- Metropolitan Archbishop: Thomas Wenski

Map
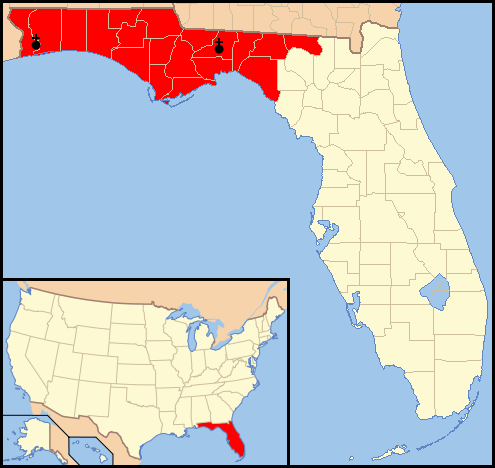

Website
- ptdiocese.org

The Catholic Diocese of Pensacola–Tallahassee (Latin: Dioecesis Pensacolensis–Talloseiensis) is a Catholic diocese in the Florida Panhandle region of the United States. The patron saint of the diocese is St. Michael the Archangel.

== Main churches ==
The three main churches of the Diocese of Pensacola-Tallahassee are:

- Basilica of St. Michael the Archangel in Pensacola, a minor basilica that is an historic church
- Cathedral of the Sacred Heart in Pensacola, the episcopal see
- Co-Cathedral of Saint Thomas More in Tallahassee

== Statistics ==
As of 2026, the Diocese of Pensacola-Tallahassee served approximately 71,000 Catholics on 14,000 mi^{2} in 53 parishes and 18 missions. The diocese has 70 priests (60 diocesan and 10 religious), along with 61 permanent deacons, 14 sisters and 17 seminarians.

== History ==
=== 1500 to 1800 ===
The first Catholic presence in the Florida Panhandle was that of five Dominican priests who celebrated a mass in the area that later became Pensacola.

By 1606, Florida was part of the Spanish Colony of New Spain. The few Catholics there were under the jurisdiction of the Diocese of Santiago de Cuba (until 1787, later of the Diocese of Havana in Cuba). By the early 1700s, the Spanish Franciscans had established a network of 40 missions in Northern and Central Florida, with 70 priests ministering to over 25,000 Native American converts. However, raids by British settlers and their Creek Native American allies from the Carolinas eventually shut down the missions. Part of the reason for the raids was that the Spanish colonists gave refuge to enslaved people who had escaped the Carolinas. A number of Timucuan Catholic converts in Northern Florida were slaughtered during these incursions.

After the end of the French and Indian War in 1763, Spain ceded all of Florida to Great Britain for the return of Cuba. Given the antagonism of Protestant Great Britain to Catholicism, the majority of the Catholic population in Florida fled to Cuba. The American Revolution ended in 1783, and Spain regained control of Florida from Great Britain the next year. Spanish priests founded St. Michael the Archangel Parish, the first parish in the region, in 1781 in Pensacola.

In 1793, the Vatican changed the jurisdiction for Florida Catholics from Havana to the Diocese of Louisiana and the Two Floridas, based in New Orleans.

=== 1800 to 1900 ===
After of the Louisiana purchase (1803), Florida returned in 1806 to the Diocese of Havana (until 1823). In the Adams–Onís Treaty of 1819, Spain ceded all of Florida to the United States, which established the Florida Territory in 1821. In 1825, Pope Leo XII erected the Vicariate of Alabama and Florida, which included all of Florida, based in Mobile, Alabama. Four years later, Pope Pius VIII erected the Diocese of Mobile in 1829, giving it jurisdiction over the Florida Panhandle west of the Apalachicola River. The first Catholic church in Tallahassee, Blessed Sacrament, was finished in 1845.

=== 1900 to 1980 ===
In 1915, St. Mary's Church was erected at Camp Walton (renamed in 1941 as Ft. Walton Beach). In 1968, the Florida portion of the Diocese of Mobile was transferred into the Diocese of St. Augustine, which included the rest of Florida. St. Bernadette's, the parish in Panama City Beach, was established as a mission church in 1956.

Pope Paul VI erected the Diocese of Pensacola–Tallahassee in 1975 with territories split off from the Diocese of St. Augustine. The pope named Auxiliary Bishop René Gracida of the Archdiocese of Miami as the first bishop of Pensacola-Tallahassee.The parish in Destin, Corpus Christi, was established in 1977.

=== 1980 to 2000 ===
In May 1983, Pope John Paul II appointed Gracida as bishop of the Diocese of Corpus Christi. Auxiliary Bishop Joseph Keith Symons of the Diocese of St. Petersburg replaced him as bishop in Pensacola-Tallahassee that month. Symons was named bishop of the Diocese of Palm Beach by John Paul II in 1990.

The next bishop of Pensacola-Tallahassee was Auxiliary Bishop John M. Smith from the Archdiocese of Newark, selected by John Paul II in 1991. In 1995, John Paul II named Smith as coadjutor bishop of the Diocese of Trenton.. John Paul II replaced Smith in 1997 with Auxiliary Bishop John Ricard of the Archdiocese of Baltimore.

=== 2000 to present ===
Thomas Crandall, pastor of St. Rose of Lima Parish in Milton, was arrested in 2001 by police acting on information from a confidential informant. The police found methamphetamine and ecstasy in his Jeep and the rectory. An investigation later determined that Crandall had stolen $100,000 from his parish. He was convicted in 2002 and sentenced to 51 months in prison. He was permanently removed from priestly ministry that year. Crandall was also convicted in 2006 of possessing child pornography and sentenced to ten years in prison.

Ricard retired as bishop of Pensacola-Tallahassee in May 2011. In December 2011, Pope Benedict XVI designated St. Michael the Archangel Church as the Basilica of St. Michael the Archangel. Benedict XVI named Gregory Parkes from the Diocese of Orlando as the fifth bishop of Pensacola-Tallahassee in 2012. In 2016, Pope Francis appointed Parkes as bishop of the Diocese of St. Petersburg.

Francis selected William Wack of the Congregation of Holy Cross as the next bishop of Pensacola-Tallahassee in 2017. During his tenure as bishop, Wack urged Catholics in his diocese to be missionary disciples. He asked them to be more evangelical in describing their relationship with Christ, saying:

"Catholics have not always been comfortable talking about a 'personal relationship with Jesus Christ.' But even though that is not our preferred language, we know innately that this is what God wants for us. We can all start by asking God to help us to grow in our relationship with Jesus in the Holy Spirit.

The diocese opened Trinity Homes, a Pensacola rental property of nine tiny homes for seniors facing homelessness, in April 2026. As of 2026, Wack is the bishop of Pensacola-Tallahassee.

=== Sex abuse ===
In April 1998, a 53-year-old man informed a priest and Archbishop John C. Favalora of the Archdiocese of Miami that Bishop Symons, then bishop of Palm Beach, had sexually abused him when he was an altar server decades earlier. When confronted, Symons admitted his guilt. In June 1998, Pope John Paul II accepted Symons's resignation as bishop of Palm Beach.

== Bishops ==
=== Bishops of Pensacola–Tallahassee ===
1. René Henry Gracida (1975 – 1983), appointed Bishop of Corpus Christi
2. Joseph Keith Symons (1983 – 1990), appointed Bishop of Palm Beach
3. John Mortimer Smith (1991 – 1995), appointed Coadjutor Bishop and later Bishop of Trenton
4. John Huston Ricard (1997 – 2011)
5. Gregory Lawrence Parkes (2012 – 2016), appointed Bishop of Saint Petersburg
6. William Albert Wack (2017 – present)

=== Diocese priest who later became a bishop ===
Martin Holley, appointed Auxiliary Bishop of Washington in 2004 and later Bishop of Memphis

== Education ==
As of 2026, the Diocese of Pensacola-Tallahasse has two high schools, one special education high school, eight elementary schools, two special education elementary schools and five early learning centers.

=== High schools ===
- St. John Paul II High School – Tallahassee
- Pensacola Catholic High School – Pensacola
