= Basilica of St. Michael the Archangel (Pensacola, Florida) =

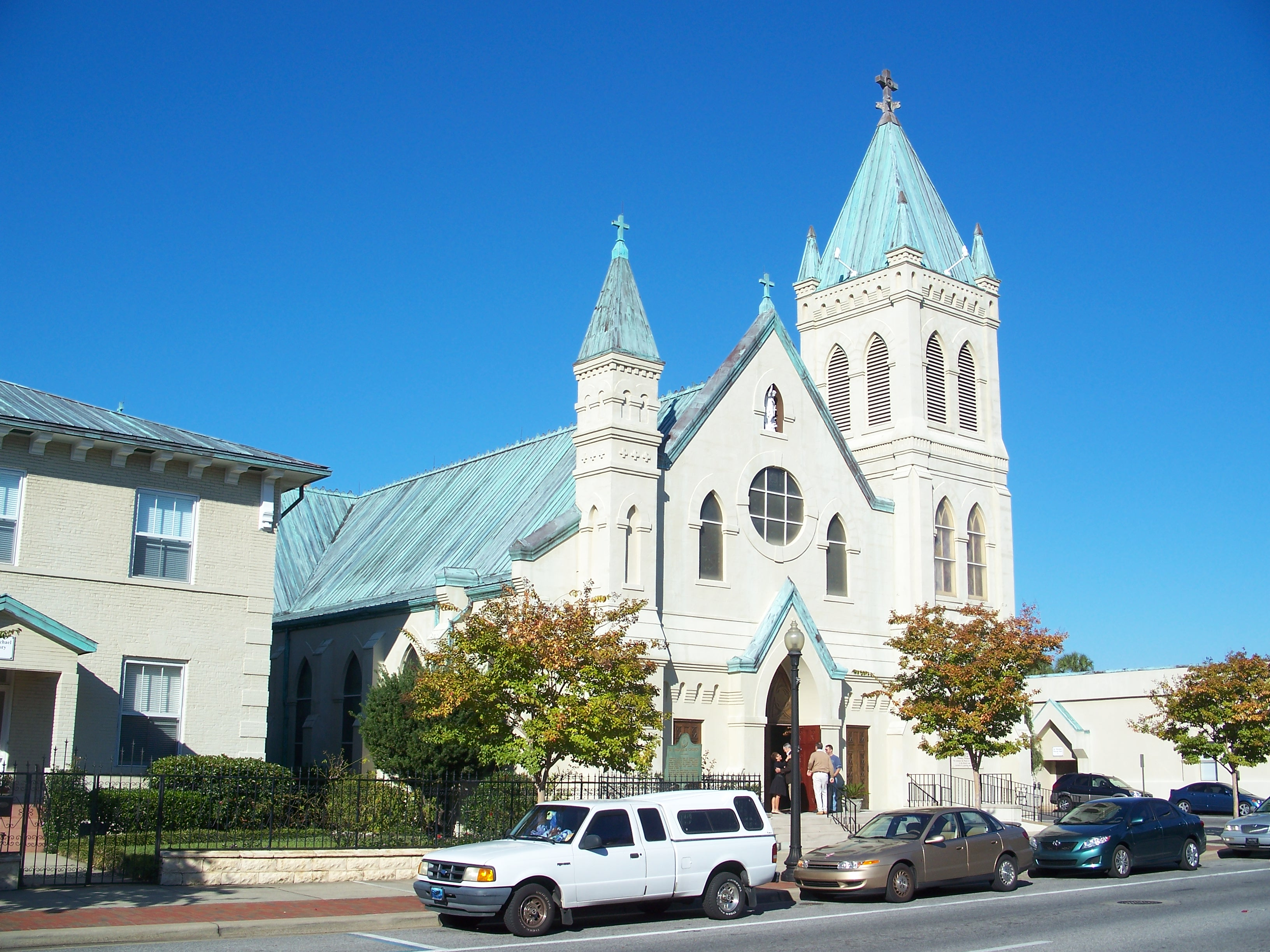

- Location in Florida
- 30°24′50″N 87°12′58″W
- Location: 19 North Palafox St. Pensacola, Florida
- Country: United States
- Denomination: Roman Catholic
- Website: https://stmichael.ptdiocese.org/

History
- Status: Minor basilica
- Founded: 1781
- Dedication: St. Michael the Archangel

Architecture
- Style: Gothic Revival
- Completed: 1886

Administration
- Diocese: Diocese of Pensacola-Tallahassee

Clergy
- Bishop: William Albert Wack
- Rector: Very Reverend Raymond Herard

The Basilica of St. Michael the Archangel in Pensacola, Florida, United States is a minor basilica of the Catholic Church in the Diocese of Pensacola-Tallahassee. St. Michael's parish was established in 1781 and the present Gothic Revival-style church building was dedicated in 1886. In recognition of its historic significance the church was elevated to a Basilica in 2011 by Pope Benedict XVI.

== Parish History ==
The Parish of St. Michael the Archangel traces its origin to August 14, 1559, with the arrival of Don Tristan de Luna and his fleet. The Dominican priests who were part of that expedition celebrated the first Mass on August 15, 1559, the Assumption of the Blessed Virgin Mary. The Parish was canonically established on May 10, 1781, and has served the Catholic community in northwest Florida for over 235 years. In recognition of the Parish’s historic significance and architectural beauty, St. Michael Church was elevated to the status of a minor basilica on December 28, 2011, by His Holiness, Pope Benedict XVI. Our mission is: “Proclaim Christ: Encounter Him in Word, Sacrament and Service.”

In 2009, when Pensacola celebrated the 450th anniversary of the first settlement, St. Michael likewise celebrated the 450th anniversary of the Catholic presence in what would become the United States of America.

1. Our History 1559-Present Day
2. The Basilica Coat of Arms

The Department of the Interior has recognized St. Michael's as a prominent and historically significant landmark since its construction.
