= Co-Cathedral of Saint Thomas More (Tallahassee, Florida) =

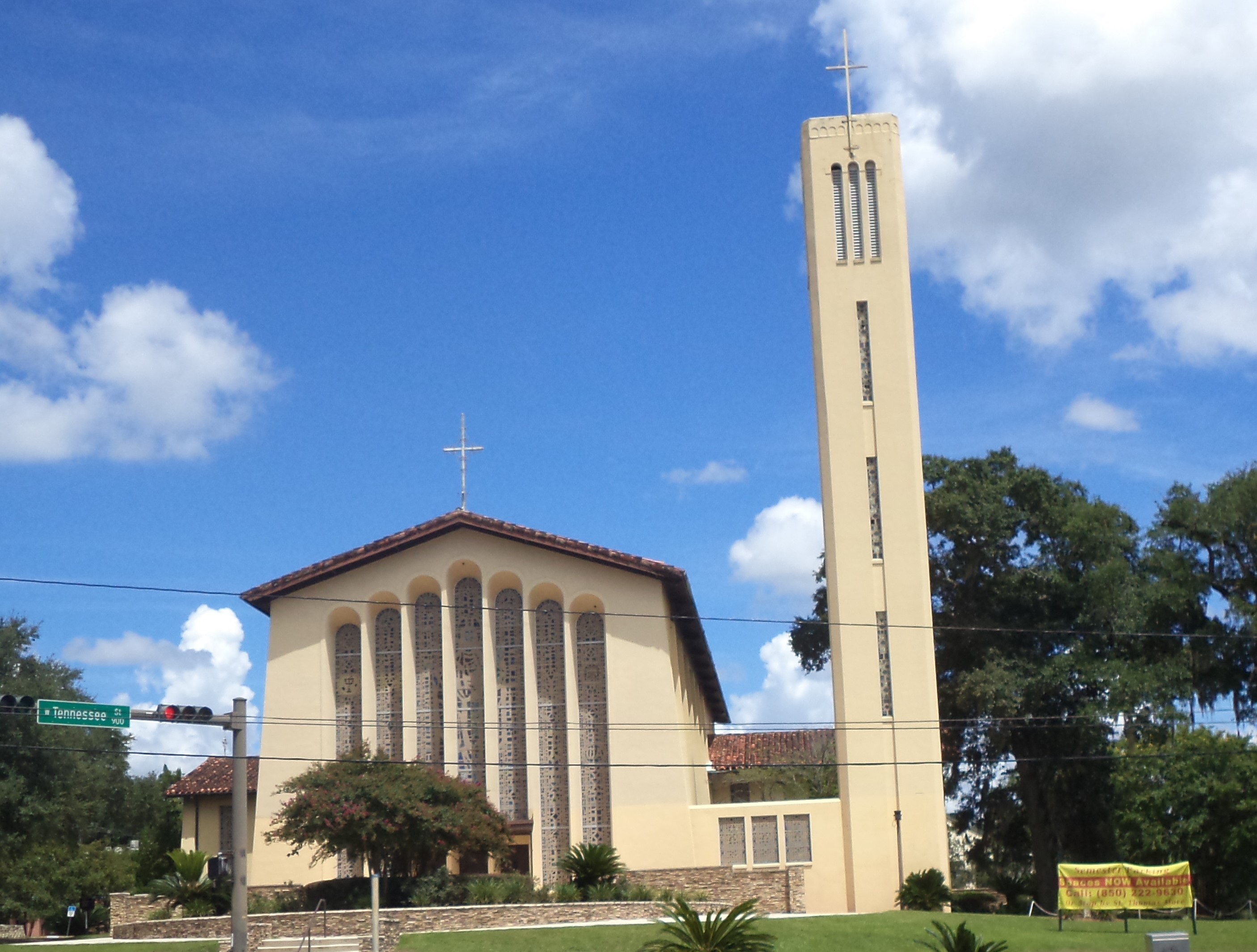

- Location within Florida Location within the United States
- 30°26′47.22″N 84°17′51.88″W
- Location: 900 W Tennessee St. Tallahassee, Florida
- Country: United States
- Denomination: Roman Catholic
- Website: www.cocathedral.com

History
- Status: Co-Cathedral
- Dedication: Thomas More

Architecture
- Groundbreaking: December 4, 1965
- Completed: 1967

Specifications
- Materials: Block & Stucco

Administration
- Diocese: Pensacola-Tallahassee

Clergy
- Bishop: William Albert Wack
- Rector: Very Reverend Timothy Holeda

The Co-Cathedral of St. Thomas More is a Catholic cathedral located in Tallahassee, Florida. Along with the Cathedral of the Sacred Heart in Pensacola, it is the seat of the Diocese of Pensacola-Tallahassee. It also provides the Catholic campus ministry at Florida State University.

== History ==
=== Early history ===
The present-day Co-Cathedral of St. Thomas More has its origins intertwining with Blessed Sacrament parish, and the 1930 establishment of a Florida State College for Women Newman Club chapter, which later became Florida State University (FSU). The Newman Club needed a designated meeting place, even when the Florida State College for Women was converted into the current Florida State University (FSU) in 1947.

It would not be until 1950, that the club acquired. Edward Conradi's residence, located on the intersection of Park Avenue and Macomb Street, just to the east of FSU grounds. This acquisition marked a significant milestone as it provided the Newman Club with its first permanent student center, featuring amenities such as a live-in housemother, a student chapel, and meeting rooms which ensured accessibility and fostered a sense of community among its members. However, the small chapel at the Newman Center soon was outgrown due to the rapidly growing number of catholic students, with lines of students waiting for mass running outside the building a common occurrence on Sundays.

=== Construction ===
The first plans for the new student center were sent in 1963 to pastor Patrick Madde of the local Blessed Sacrament parish, who suggested enlarging the chapel to accommodate more parishioners. Designs underwent modifications until 1965 when George W. Stickle drafted the final blueprint.

His design features a chapel and an adjacent student center, with a kitchen, rooms, and offices for three priests, a lounge, and a library. Spanning half a city block, the combined complex features a towering bell, 95 feet high, commemorating the 400th anniversary of the arrival of the Spanish at St. Augustine. The architecture is a two-story cruciform layout building with a modified mid-century Spanish design and a distinctive red-tiled gabled roof. The front facade features seven elongated narrow, rounded arches reminiscent of English and Gothic Styles.

Central to the chapel's appearance were its stained-glass windows, done in the dalle de verre style called by the architect the key to its beauty. These windows were designed by the French artist Jean Barillet, renowned for his work on restorations at cathedrals and Chartres. His masterpiece emphasized Christ as the focal point of the Christian faith, with the center windows portraying only the magnificent figure of Christ, illuminated in light, and the remaining windows featuring abstract colors and designs.

Finally, on December 4, 1965, the groundbreaking of the construction occurred, with Demetree Builders of Orlando overseeing construction until completion two years later. The chapel's official dedication was on October 8, 1967, by Bishop Hurley.

=== Transition to Co-Cathedral ===
The chapel status would be short lived, as in 1968, the new Bishop of St. Augustine, Paul Tanner, would elevate it to the status of a student parish, where it would stay for seven years. On October 7, 1975, six days after the formation of the Diocese of Pensacola-Tallahassee, the parish was made the Co-Cathedral of St. Thomas More.

== Former and current clergy ==
=== Bishops ===
1. René Henry Gracida (1975–1983)
2. Joseph Keith Symons (1983–1990)
3. John Mortimer Smith (1991–1995)
4. John Huston Ricard, S.S.J. (1997–2011)
5. Gregory Lawrence Parkes (2012–2016)
6. William Albert Wack, C.S.C. (2017–present)

=== Rectors ===
- William A. Kerr (1975–1984)
- James Amos (1984–1987)
- Charles W. Roland (1987–1990)
- Micheal W. Tugwell (1990–1999) & (2003–2013)
- Dennis O'Brien (2000)
- C. Slade Crawford (2000–2003)
- John Cayer (2013–2022)
- Timothy Holeda (2022–present)

=== Other Clergy ===
- Lawrence Cunningham
- William Stahler 1969
- Edward Dempsy
- Alfonso Figueroa
- James Gilligan
- Sean O'Sullivan
- J. Franklin Murray, S.J.
- Francis Duda
- Ronald H. Brown, T.O.R.
- Peter LeMaire
- Joseph Dinh-Tran Ngan
- Guy Morin
- Paul A. Blaes
- David McCreanor
- Stephen C. Bosso
- H. Michael Wever
- Robert A. Washa
- William P. Brown
- Gerald Vossen
- Paul E. Stewart
- James J. Flaherty
- Peter N. Wood
- Guy T. Wilson, S.T.
- Robert C. Miller
- John Struzzo, C.S.C.
- Paul Lauwers
- Oscar E. Sarmiento
- Roy E. Marien
- August A. Rakoczy
- Isidore Nguyen Baky
- Thomas J. Guido
- John Boat
- Silvai R. Selvappan (Fr. Cross)
- Joseph Kayany
- Sebastian Naslund, O.S.B.
- Thomas Collins
- Michael Shaw
- E. J. MacKinnon
- Francisco Valdovinos
- Michael Flynn
- John Cayer
- Father Eddie Jones
- Father Chris Le Blanc
- Christian Winklejohn
- Timothy Holeda

== See also ==
- List of Catholic cathedrals in the United States
- List of cathedrals in Florida
