= Manuel de Jesús Rodríguez =

American Catholic bishop (born 1974)

His Excellency, The Most Reverend Manuel de Jesús Rodríguez
- Bishop of Palm Beach
- Church: Catholic Church
- Diocese: Palm Beach
- Appointed: December 19, 2025
- Installed: February 24, 2026
- Predecessor: Gerald Barbarito

Orders
- Ordination: July 3, 2004
- Consecration: February 24, 2026 by Thomas Wenski, Gerald Barbarito and Robert J. Brennan

Personal details
- Born: January 15, 1974 (age 52) Moca, Dominican Republic
- Motto: Veritas liberabit vos (The truth will set you free)

Styles of Manuel de Jesús Rodríguez
- Reference style: His Excellency; The Most Reverend
- Spoken style: Your Excellency
- Religious style: Bishop

Manuel de Jesús Rodríguez (born January 15, 1974) is a Dominican-born American Catholic prelate who serves as Bishop of Palm Beach.

== Biography ==
Rodríguez was formerly a member of the Salesians. A native Spanish speaker, Rodríguez is also fluent in English, Italian, and French.

On July 3, 2004, Rodríguez was ordained to the priesthood. He came to the Diocese of Brooklyn in 2009, assigned as a parochial vicar at St. Michael Parish in Sunset Park, Brooklyn until 2011. During his time as pastor of Saints Peter and Paul Parish in Williamsburg, Brooklyn (2011–2014), he was incardinated into (became affiliated with) the diocese on June 29, 2012. He then served as the pastor of Presentation of the Blessed Virgin Mary Parish in Jamaica, Queens, from 2014 to 2020 and then served as pastor at Our Lady of Sorrows Parish in Corona, Queens, until 2026.

=== Episcopal career ===
Pope Leo XIV appointed Rodríguez bishop for the Diocese of Palm Beach on December 19, 2025. His consecration as bishop occurred on February 24, 2026.

His coat of arms features a charge of an antique locomotive, which is a symbol of his hometown of Moca and of migrants. Rodríguez was insistent on adding this "unusual" charge, as it was closely associated with the city.

== See also ==
- Catholic Church hierarchy
- Catholic Church in the United States
- Historical list of the Catholic bishops of the United States
- List of Catholic bishops of the United States
- Lists of patriarchs, archbishops, and bishops

== Episcopal succession ==
Catholic Church titles
Preceded by Gerald Barbarito	Bishop of Palm Beach; 2026-present	Succeeded by Incumbent
