= Sacred Heart Catholic Church (Pensacola, Florida) =

- U.S. National Register of Historic Places
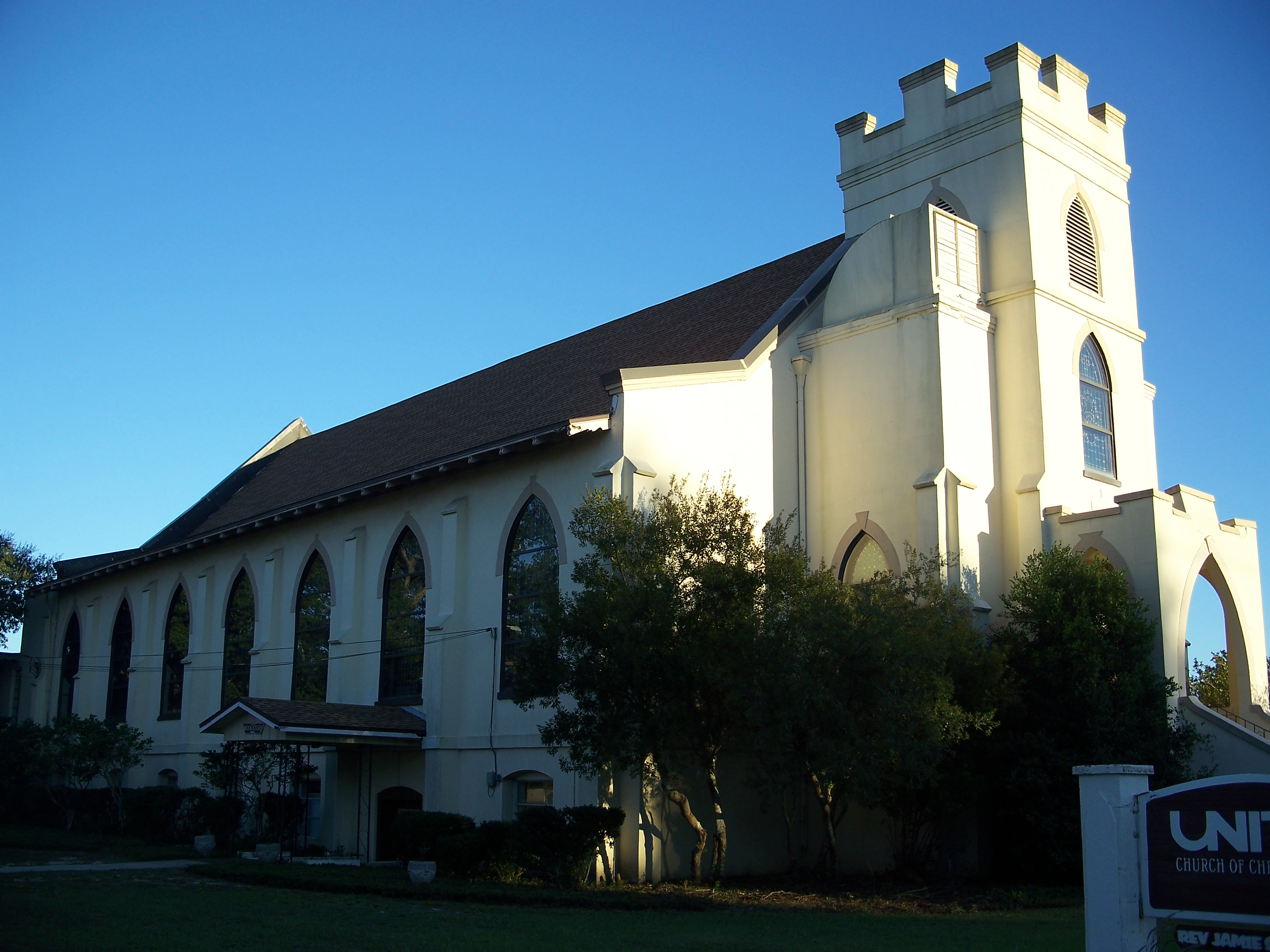

- Location within Florida Location within the United States
- Location: Pensacola, Florida, USA
- Coordinates: 30°25′13.4″N 87°12′23.36″W
- NRHP reference No.: 08001161
- Added to NRHP: December 10, 2008

Sacred Heart Catholic Church is a historic church at 716 North 9th Ave in Pensacola, Florida, United States. Completed in 1906, it was sold to the city of Pensacola in 1956. The Unity Church bought the building in 1982. On December 10, 2008, it was added to the U.S. National Register of Historic Places.
