= Joseph Michael Sullivan =

American priest

His Excellency Joseph Michael Sullivan
- Titular Bishop of Suliana
- Church: Roman Catholic Church
- See: Titular See of Suliana
- In office: 1980–2013
- Predecessor: Alfredo Ignacio Llaguno Canals
- Successor: Vacant

Orders
- Ordination: June 2, 1956
- Consecration: October 24, 1980 by Francis John Mugavero

Personal details
- Born: March 23, 1930 Brooklyn, New York, U.S.
- Died: June 7, 2013 (aged 83)

Styles of Joseph M. Sullivan
- Reference style: The Most Reverend
- Spoken style: Your Excellency
- Religious style: Monsignor
- Posthumous style: not applicable

Ordination history of Joseph Michael Sullivan
History
Episcopal consecration
- Consecrated by: Francis John Mugavero
Episcopal succession
Bishops consecrated by Joseph Michael Sullivan as principal consecrator
- Ignatius Anthony Catanello: August 22, 1994

Joseph Michael Sullivan (March 23, 1930 – June 7, 2013) was an American priest and later Auxiliary bishop of the Diocese of Brooklyn, New York in the Roman Catholic Church from 1980 to 2005.

== Biography ==
Born in Brooklyn, New York City, Sullivan was ordained to the priesthood for the Diocese of Brooklyn on June 2, 1956. He was elected executive vice-president of the board of trustees of Catholic Charities USA in 1979.

Sullivan was appointed titular bishop of Suliana on October 4, 1980, and was consecrated bishop on November 24, 1980. As auxiliary, Bishop Sullivan held the titles of Vicar for Human Services and regional bishop for the 62 parishes of Brooklyn's West Vicariate. Sullivan served as chairman of the Catholic Medical Center of Brooklyn and Queens and of the Social Develop and World Peace department of the U.S. bishops' conference. In the late 1990s, Bishop Sullivan chaired an ad hoc committee to produce a pastoral letter on charity, with which he intended "to reclaim the meaning of charity."

Sullivan retired on May 12, 2005.

He died on June 7, 2013, from injuries sustained in an auto accident May 30, 2013.

== See also ==
- Diocese of Brooklyn

Catholic Church titles
Preceded by –	Auxiliary Bishop of Brooklyn; 1980–2005	Succeeded by –
Preceded by Alfredo Ignacio Llaguno Canals	Roman Catholic Titular See of Suliana; 1980–2013	Succeeded by –
