= René Arnold Valero =

American Roman Catholic bishop (1930–2019)

His Excellency, The Most Reverend René Arnold Valero
- Auxiliary Bishop Emeritus of Brooklyn; Titular Bishop of Vicus Turris
- Archdiocese: New York
- Diocese: Brooklyn
- Appointed: October 4, 1980
- Installed: November 24, 1980
- Term ended: October 27, 2005
- Other post: Titular Bishop of Vicus Turris

Orders
- Ordination: June 2, 1956
- Consecration: November 24, 1980 by Francis Mugavero, John J. Snyder, and Charles Richard Mulrooney

Personal details
- Born: August 15, 1930 New York, New York
- Died: March 10, 2019 (aged 88)
- Denomination: Roman Catholic

Styles of René Arnold Valero
- Reference style: His Excellency; The Most Reverend
- Spoken style: Your Excellency
- Religious style: Bishop

René Arnold Valero (August 15, 1930 – March 10, 2019) was an American prelate of the Roman Catholic Church who served as Auxiliary bishop of the Diocese of Brooklyn, New York from 1980 to 2005.

== Biography ==
Born in Manhattan, New York City, Valero was ordained to the priesthood on June 2, 1956, for the Diocese of Brooklyn.

On October 4, 1980, he was named auxiliary bishop of the Brooklyn Diocese and titular bishop of Vicus Turris. He was consecrated bishop on November 24, 1980.

Valero retired on October 27, 2005.

Valero died on Sunday, March 10, 2019.

== See also ==
Catholic Church titles
Preceded by –	Auxiliary Bishop of Brooklyn; 1980 – 2005	Succeeded by –
