= Sakiet Ezzit =

Coordinates: 34°48′00″N 10°46′12″E

Sakiet Ezzit ساقية الزيت
- Commune and town
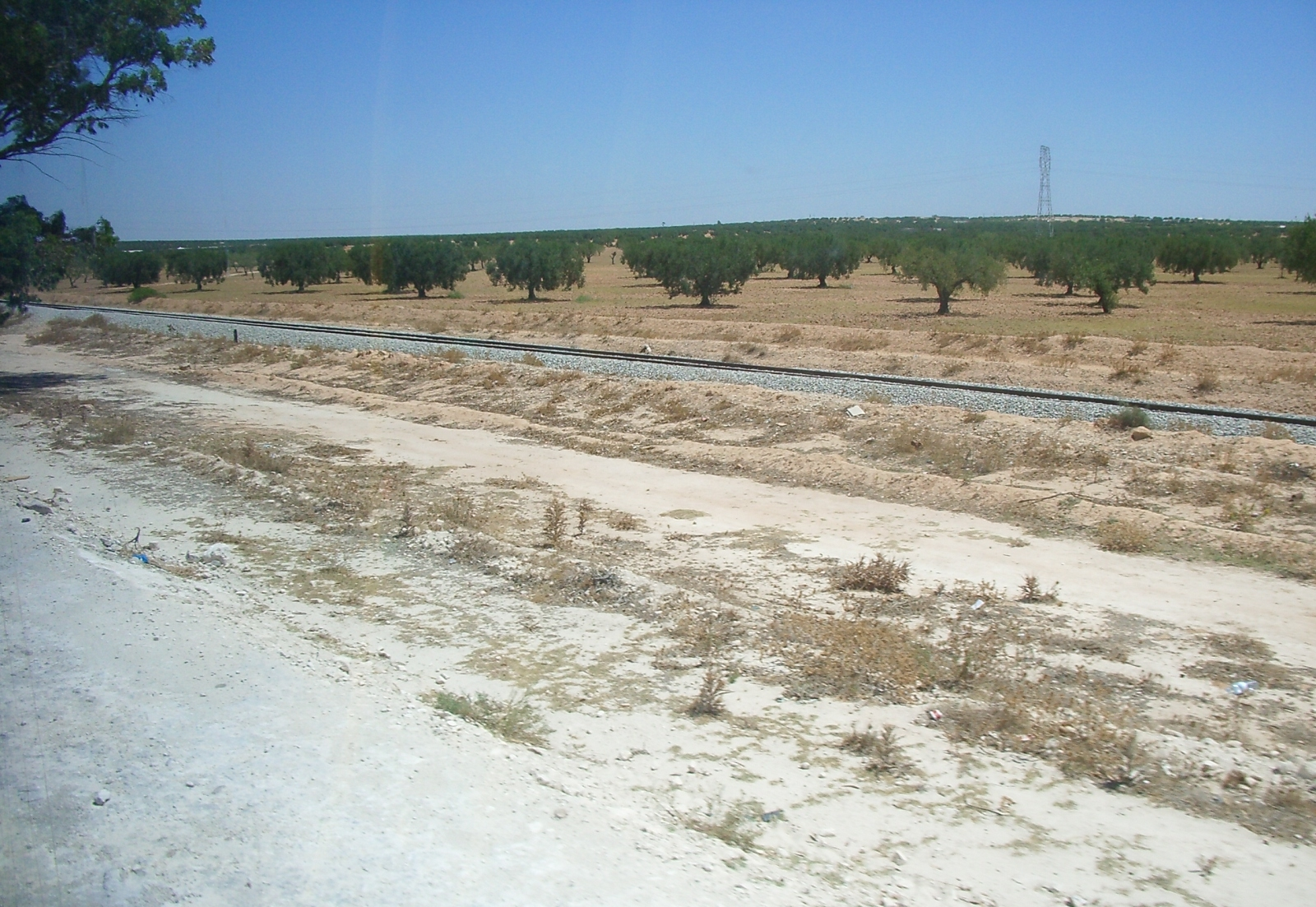
- Sakiet Ezzit
- Interactive map of Sakiet Ezzit
- Country: Tunisia
- Governorate: Sfax Governorate

Population (2022)
  - Total: 100,000
- Time zone: UTC+1 (CET)
- Website: www.commune-sakietezzit.gov.tn

Sakiet Ezzit (Tunisian Arabic: ساقية الزيت sāqīyat az-zīt) is a town and commune in the Sfax Governorate, Tunisia. Attached administratively to the governorate of Sfax, it is the center of a delegation counting 72 481 inhabitants in 2006 and is a municipality with 44,886 inhabitants in 2004.2 The city itself has a population of 12 613 inhabitants. As of 2004 it had a population of 44,886.

== Economy ==
As its name suggests, sakiet ezzit is a major center for the processing and marketing of olives. The governorate of Sfax indeed provides 40% of national production. It hosts 25 traditional and modern oil mills.

Today, its activities evolve towards services: sakiet ezzit and houses the largest automotive technology business center of the region, with a turn rate around 100 vehicles checked daily. It also houses nine banks, a post office and several other service establishments (CNSS, CNAM, finance recipe, etc.).

The city houses one of six technology parks in Tunisia, located in the El Ons. The latter started operations in 2007, following a study by the Chamber of Commerce and Industry of Sfax and funded by the US Agency for International Development; it showed that the local economic climate was favorable to the development of a technology park focusing on information technology and communication and the prospects for ongoing, medium and long terms were promising.

The technology is specialized in computer and multimedia; its construction is planned over twenty years, from 86000 m^{2} in area reached after the first five years - welcoming sixty companies offering 2300 jobs - 233 000 m2, offering a total capacity of 155 companies and 8100 jobs. It is home to date two higher education institutions and a business incubator, the largest consulting firms in the country such as Telnet. In the future, the technology is expected to bring together training institutions, research organizations, a technology transfer center, production components and a business park (administration, hotel, conference center, etc.).

== Education and Training ==
At the start of 2013, the university city of El-Ons sakiet ezzit expected to house more than 8,000 students spread over the following institutions:

- Higher Institute of Computer and Multimedia;
- Higher Institute of Electronics and Communication;
- Higher Institute of Industrial Management;
- computer research center, multimedia and digital processing;
- electronic training center;
- leather shoes and training center;
- The university city also has a restaurant and a dormitory.

As for secondary education sakiet ezzit has three schools of secondary education, three colleges and fourteen elementary schools.

== Population ==
2014 Census (Municipal)
| Homes | Families | Males | Females | Total |
|---|---|---|---|---|
| 24426 | 21157 | 40195 | 39348 | 79543 |

== See also ==
- List of cities in Tunisia
