= William Albert Wack =

American bishop (born 1967)

His Excellency, The Most Reverend William Albert Wack CSC
- Bishop of Pensacola–Tallahassee
- Diocese: Pensacola-Tallahassee
- Appointed: May 29, 2017
- Installed: August 22, 2017
- Predecessor: Gregory Parkes

Orders
- Ordination: April 9, 1994 by James Hector MacDonald
- Consecration: August 22, 2017 by Thomas Wenski, Daniel R. Jenky, and Joe S. Vásquez

Personal details
- Born: June 28, 1967 (age 58) South Bend, Indiana, US
- Education: Holy Cross College (Indiana); University of Notre Dame
- Motto: Come. Follow me.

Styles of William Albert Wack, C.S.C.
- Reference style: His Excellency; The Most Reverend
- Spoken style: Your Excellency
- Religious style: Bishop

William Albert Wack, CSC (born June 28, 1967) is an American Catholic prelate who has served as Bishop of Pensacola–Tallahassee since 2017. He is a member of the Congregation of Holy Cross.

== Early life ==
William Wack was born June 28, 1967, in South Bend, Indiana. He is the second youngest of ten children, including a younger brother who followed him into the priesthood. After graduating from LaSalle High School and attending Holy Cross College in Notre Dame, Indiana, for one year, Wack transferred to the University of Notre Dame. He graduated in 1989 from Notre Dame with a degree in government and international relations.

Having decided to become a priest, Wack entered the novitiate for the Congregation of Holy Cross (CSC) in August 1989. He professed his temporary vows in the Congregation of Holy Cross in 1990. He then returned to Notre Dame, where he received a Master of Divinity degree in May 1993. On August 28, 1993, Wack professed his solemn vows to the CSC and was ordained a deacon the following day.

=== Priesthood ===
On April 9, 1994, Wack was ordained to the priesthood at the Basilica of the Sacred Heart at Notre Dame University for the CSC by Archbishop James MacDonald.

After his 1994 ordination, the CSC assigned Wack as an associate pastor of Sacred Heart Parish in Colorado Springs, Colorado for three-plus years. In 1997, he returned to Indiana to serve as associate director of vocations for Holy Cross College, as well as working in campus ministry at Notre Dame University. The CSC transferred Wack to Phoenix, Arizona, in 2002 to serve as director of André House, a facility serving the homeless and poor of Phoenix. In June 2009, the CSC sent Wack to Austin, Texas to serve as pastor of St. Ignatius Martyr Parish.

=== Bishop of Pensacola-Tallahassee ===
On May 29, 2017, Pope Francis appointed Wack as diocesan bishop for the Diocese of Pensacola–Tallahassee. In an interview with the Pensacola News Journal before his consecration, Wack said "all I ever wanted to be was a priest." On August 22, 2017, Wack was consecrated at the Pensacola Bay Center in Pensacola by Archbishop Thomas Wenski, with Bishops Daniel R. Jenky and Joe S. Vásquez serving as co-consecrators.

In an April 2023 interview with the National Catholic Register, Wack urged Catholics to become missionary disciples. He called for them to be more evangelical in describing their relationship with Christ, saying:

"Catholics have not always been comfortable talking about a 'personal relationship with Jesus Christ.' But even though that is not our preferred language, we know innately that this is what God wants for us. We can all start by asking God to help us to grow in our relationship with Jesus in the Holy Spirit.

In November 2023, Wack celebrated a mass for the sealing of documentation for the Vatican on the canonization cause of the Martyrs of La Florida. These were 58 men, both clerics and Native American laypeople, who were killed in Spanish Florida between 1549 and 1712 by raiders from the Thirteen American colonies

== See also ==
- Catholic Church hierarchy
- Catholic Church in the United States
- Historical list of the Catholic bishops of the United States
- List of Catholic bishops of the United States
- Lists of patriarchs, archbishops, and bishops

== Episcopal succession ==
Catholic Church titles
Preceded by Gregory Parkes	Bishop of Pensacola–Tallahassee; 2017-Present	Succeeded by Incumbent
