= Thomas Vose Daily =

Roman Catholic bishop

His Excellency, The Most Reverend Thomas Vose Daily
- Bishop of Brooklyn
- Church: Roman Catholic Church
- Archdiocese: New York
- Diocese: Brooklyn
- Appointed: February 20, 1990
- Installed: April 18, 1990
- Term ended: August 1, 2003
- Predecessor: Francis Mugavero
- Successor: Nicholas Anthony DiMarzio
- Previous posts: Bishop of Palm Beach (1984–1990) |Auxiliary Bishop of Boston (1974–1984)

Orders
- Ordination: January 10, 1952 by Richard Cushing
- Consecration: February 11, 1975 by Humberto Sousa Medeiros, Thomas Joseph Riley, and Lawrence Joseph Riley

Personal details
- Born: September 23, 1927 Belmont, Massachusetts, US
- Died: May 14, 2017 (aged 89) Douglaston, Queens, New York City, US
- Buried: Bishop's Chapel of the Immaculate Conception Center; Douglaston
- Denomination: Roman Catholic Church
- Education: Boston College; St. John's Seminary
- Motto: Dominus lux mea (The Lord is my light)
Styles of Thomas Vose Daily
- Reference style: His Excellency; The Most Reverend
- Spoken style: Your Excellency
- Religious style: Bishop

Thomas Vose Daily (September 23, 1927 – May 14, 2017) was an American prelate of the Roman Catholic Church who served as bishop of the Diocese of Brooklyn in New York from 1990 to 2003. He previously served as bishop of the Diocese of Palm Beach in Florida from 1984 to 1990 and as an auxiliary bishop of the Archdiocese of Boston in Massachusetts from 1975 to 1984

== Biography ==
=== Early life ===
Thomas Daily was born in Belmont, Massachusetts, to John F. and Mary McBride (née Vose) Daily, on September 23, 1927. He attended at Boston College and later St. John's Seminary in Boston, Massachusetts.

=== Priesthood ===
Daily was ordained a priest of the Archdiocese of Boston on January 10, 1952, by Cardinal Richard Cushing at the Cathedral of the Holy Cross in Boston. Following his ordination, the archdiocese assigned Daily as curate for St. Ann's Parish in Quincy, Massachusetts. He remained in that post through the rest of that decade. In 1960, Daily joined the Missionary Society of St. James the Apostle, which assigned him to the Limatambo area of Cusco, Peru. He spent five years as a missionary in Peru.

After returning to Boston, Daily was assigned again to St. Ann's Parish, where he served as assistant pastor until 1971. Cardinal Humberto Medeiros named Daily as his personal secretary and later as vicar for temporalities.

=== Auxiliary Bishop of Boston ===
On December 28, 1974, Pope Paul VI appointed Daily as an auxiliary bishop of Boston. He was consecrated at the Cathedral of the Holy Cross on February 11, 1975, by Medeiros. In 1976, Medeiros appointed Daily as vicar general of the archdiocese. Because of his fluency in Spanish, he was given special duties regarding the Spanish-speaking members of the archdiocese.

=== Bishop of Palm Beach ===
On July 17, 1984, Daily was appointed by Pope John Paul II as the first bishop of the new Diocese of Palm Beach. Daily led many anti-abortion prayer vigils at local women's health clinics in the diocese. From 1987 to 2005, Daily also served as the supreme chaplain of the Knights of Columbus.

=== Bishop of Brooklyn ===
On February 20, 1990, John Paul II appointed Daily as the sixth bishop of Brooklyn, succeeding Bishop Francis J. Mugavero. Daily was installed on April 18, 1990. Shortly after his installation, he responded to a reporter's question by stating that New York Governor Mario Cuomo, would not be welcomed as a speaker in the diocese's parishes because of his pro-choice position on abortion rights for women.

In 2002, Daily was criticized for his past involvement in cases of priests accused of sexual abuse in the Archdiocese of Boston. He acknowledged his "profound regret" over some of his decisions when vicar general in Boston.

=== Retirement and legacy ===
On August 1, 2003, Daily announced his resignation as bishop of Brooklyn had been accepted by the Vatican, ten months after he had submitted a letter of resignation upon reaching the mandatory retirement age of 75. In retirement, Daily served as a member of the Pontifical Commission for Latin America and as a board member of the Society of St. James the Apostle in Boston and the National Catholic Office for Persons with Disabilities in Washington, D.C.

Thomas Daily died on May 15, 2017, at the Bishop Mugavero Residence in Douglaston, Queens in New York City He was 89.

== See also ==
- Catholic Church hierarchy
- Catholic Church in the United States
- Historical list of the Catholic bishops of the United States
- List of Catholic bishops of the United States
- Lists of patriarchs, archbishops, and bishops

== Episcopal succession ==
Catholic Church titles
Preceded by Francis Mugavero	Bishop of Brooklyn; 1990–2003	Succeeded by Nicholas Anthony DiMarzio
New title Diocese erected	Bishop of Palm Beach; 1984–1990	Succeeded by Joseph Keith Symons
Preceded by -	Auxiliary Bishop of Boston; 1974–1984	Succeeded by -
