= Joseph Aloysius Burke =

Joseph Aloysius Burke may refer to:

- Joseph A. Burke (1886–1962), American Catholic Bishop
- Joe Burke (composer) (1884–1950), American composer
- Joe Burke (infielder) (1867–1940), American baseball player
