= Joseph A. Burke =

American prelate

His Excellency, The Most Reverend Joseph A. Burke
- Bishop of Buffalo; Titular Bishop of Vita
- Diocese: Buffalo
- In office: 1952–1962
- Predecessor: John F. O'Hara
- Successor: James A. McNulty
- Previous posts: Auxiliary Bishop of Buffalo (1943 to 1952)

Orders
- Ordination: August 3, 1912 by Charles H. Colton
- Consecration: June 29, 1944 by Amleto Giovanni Cicognani

Personal details
- Born: August 27, 1886 Buffalo, New York, US
- Died: October 17, 1962 (aged 76) Rome, Italy
- Buried: St. Joseph Cathedral, Buffalo
- Denomination: Catholic
- Education: Canisius College; University of Innsbruck
- Motto: Fiat voluntas tua (Let your will be done)

Styles of Joseph Aloysius Burke
- Reference style: His Excellency; The Most Reverend
- Spoken style: Your Excellency
- Religious style: Bishop

Joseph Aloysius Burke (August 27, 1886 – October 16, 1962) was an American Catholic prelate who served as bishop of Buffalo in New York State from 1952 until his death in 1962. He previously served as an auxiliary bishop of Buffalo from 1943 to 1952.

== Biography ==
=== Early life ===
Joseph Burke was born on August 27, 1886, in Buffalo, New York, to Joseph S. and Amelia (née Howard) Burke. The son of a boilermaker, he wanted to enter the priesthood since the age of six. He attended Canisius High School and Canisius College, both in Buffalo. He made his theological studies at the University of Innsbruck in Austria-Hungary.

=== Priesthood ===
Returning to Buffalo, Burke was ordained a priest for the Diocese of Buffalo by Bishop Charles H. Colton on August 3, 1912. After the entry of the United States into World War I in 1917, Burke enlisted in the US Army Chaplain Corps. He was attached as an chaplain to the 91st Division on the Belgian front. After Burke was discharged from the Army in 1919, the diocese assigned him first as a curate and pastor in its parishes, then as a teacher at the Mount Carmel Guild and D'Youville College in Buffalo.

=== Auxiliary Bishop of Buffalo ===
On April 20, 1943, Burke was appointed titular bishop of Vita and the first auxiliary bishop of Buffalo by Pope Pius XII. He received his episcopal consecration at Saint Joseph Cathedral in Buffalo on June 29, 1943, from Archbishop Amleto Cicognani, with Archbishop Thomas Walsh and Bishop Edmund Gibbons serving as co-consecrators. Burke selected as his episcopal motto, "Let Your Will Be Done".

Following the death of Bishop John A. Duffy in September 1944, Burke served as apostolic administrator of the diocese until the appointment of Bishop John O'Hara in March 1945.

=== Bishop of Buffalo ===
When O'Hara was later promoted to archbishop of Philadelphia, Burke was named to succeed him as the ninth bishop of Buffalo by Pius XII on February 9, 1952. He was the first native son of the diocese to become its bishop. His installation took place in Buffalo on April 30, 1952.

During his 10-year administration, Burke gave his support to the Holy Name Society, missions, the Pre-Cana program, Puerto Rican migrants, and displaced persons. He also continued the expansion and construction of educational institutions, including St. John Vianney Seminary in East Aurora, New York. The Vatican elevated Burke to assistant at the pontifical throne in 1956. The Government of Italy honored him as a commander of the Order of Merit of the Italian Republic in 1960.

=== Death and legacy ===
At age 76, Joseph Burke died in Rome at Salvador Mundi International Hospital on October 16, 1962, while attending the Second Vatican Council. His death was the first among the bishops attending the council. He was buried in the chapel of Christ the King Seminary in East Aurora, New York. His body was moved to St. Joseph Cathedral after the seminary closed in 2020.

Catholic Church titles
Preceded by John F. O'Hara	Bishop of Buffalo; 1952–1962	Succeeded by James A. McNulty
Preceded by –	Auxiliary Bishop of Buffalo; 1943–1952	Succeeded by –
