= Charles H. Colton =

American Catholic prelate (1848–1915)

His Excellency, The Right Reverend Charles Henry Colton
- Bishop of Buffalo
- Church: Roman Catholic Church
- See: Diocese of Buffalo
- Installed: 1903
- Term ended: 1915
- Predecessor: James Edward Quigley
- Successor: Dennis Joseph Dougherty

Orders
- Ordination: June 10, 1876 by Bernard John McQuaid
- Consecration: August 24, 1903 by John Murphy Farley

Personal details
- Born: October 15, 1848 New York City, US
- Died: May 9, 1915 (aged 66) Buffalo, New York, US
- Buried: Saint Joseph's Cathedral
- Parents: Patrick Smith; Teresa Augusta (née Mullin)
- Education: Saint Joseph's Cathedral; St. Francis Xavier College; St. Joseph's Seminary
- Motto: "God is with us"

Charles Henry Colton (October 15, 1848 – May 9, 1915) was an American Catholic prelate who served as bishop of Buffalo in New York State from 1903 until his death in 1915.

== Biography ==
=== Early life and education ===
Charles Colton was born on October 15, 1848, in New York City to Patrick Smith and Teresa Augusta (née Mullin) Colton, both Irish immigrants. He received his early education at Public School No. 5 and the Latin school of St. Stephen's Parish in Manhattan. As a boy, he worked as a clerk in a dry goods store. In 1869, deciding to become a priest, Colton entered St. Francis Xavier College in Manhattan, graduating in 1873. He then studied theology at St. Joseph's Seminary in Troy, New York.

=== Priesthood ===
Colton was ordained to the priesthood by Bishop Bernard John McQuaid for the Archdiocese of New York on June 10, 1876, at St. Joseph's Siminary. After his ordination, the archdiocese assigned Colton as a curate at St. Stephen's Parish, with Edward McGlynn as pastor. Colton remained at St. Stephen's for ten years, also serving as a chaplain at Bellevue Hospital in Manhattan. In 1886, Colton was named pastor of Our Lady of Mercy Parish in Port Chester, New York.

In 1887, the archdiocese excommunicated McGlynn for his political activities. They returned Colton to St. Stephen's to Arthur Donnelly, who had been assigned as temporary administrator of the parish. Later that year, Colton assumed the role of pastor at St. Stephen's upon Donnelly's resignation. Colton enjoyed success in his new post, restoring harmony among the congregation, eliminating the parish debt of $152,000 and establishing a parochial school. In addition to his pastoral duties, Colton served as chancellor of the archdiocese as of 1896.

=== Bishop of Buffalo ===
On May 20, 1903, Colton was appointed the fourth bishop of Buffalo by Pope Leo XIII. He received his episcopal consecration on August 24, 1903, from Archbishop John Farley, with McQuaid and Charles McDonnell serving as co-consecrators, in St. Patrick's Cathedral in Manhattan.

During Colton's tenure, the diocese was composed of 72 churches, 18 combination school-churches, 30 schools, 12 academies, 13 hospitals, and charitable institutions, six convents, and 28 rectories.

== Death ==
Colton died in Buffalo on May 9, 1915, aged 66. He is interred in the crypt of St. Joseph's Cathedral in Buffalo.

Catholic Church titles
Preceded by James E. Quigley	Bishop of Buffalo; 1903–1915	Succeeded by Dennis Joseph Dougherty
