= St. Joseph's Collegiate Institute =

Preparatory school in Kenmore, New York

Saint Joseph's Collegiate Institute

Location
- 845 Kenmore Avenue; Physical Location: Tonawanda, New York; Mailing Address: Buffalo, New York 14223; United States; 42.959°N 78.849°W

Information
- Type: Private, All-Male
- Motto: Signum Fidei (Sign of Faith)
- Religious affiliations: Roman Catholic; (De La Salle Brothers)
- Patron saint: St. Jean-Baptiste de La Salle
- Established: 1861; 165 years ago
- Founder: Institute of the Brothers of the Christian Schools
- CEEB code: 331-095
- President: Christopher Fulco
- Principal: James Spillman '95
- Grades: 9–12
- Enrollment: 603 (2019-2020)
- Student to teacher ratio: 14:1
- Campus size: 10 acres (40,000 m^{2})
- Color: Maroon - Silver - White
- Song: When The Saints Go Marching In
- Athletics conference: Monsignor Martin Athletic Association
- Sports: List: Baseball; Basketball; Football; Volleyball; Bowling; Cross Country; Golf; Indoor Track; Track and Field; Ice Hockey; Lacrosse; Swimming; Soccer; Squash; Rowing; Wrestling
- Mascot: Masked Marauder
- Team name: Marauders
- Rival: Canisius High School
- Publication: The Collegiate
- Yearbook: Star
- Tuition: $15,900 (2023–24 base)
- Affiliation: Middle States Association of Colleges and Schools; Christian Brothers' Education Association; NCEA
- Website: https://www.sjci.com/

St. Joseph's Collegiate Institute, founded in 1861, is an independent Roman Catholic college preparatory school for boys run by the Institute of the Brothers of the Christian Schools in Tonawanda, New York. Established by the De La Salle Brothers, SJCI is accredited by the Middle States Association of Colleges and Schools. It is a member of the Christian Brothers' Education Association, The College Board, and the National Catholic Educational Association.

== History ==
The History of St. Joseph's Collegiate Institute is predated by only a few years by that of the Roman Catholic Diocese of Buffalo, which was established on April 23, 1847. Very Rev John Timon, named the first Bishop of Buffalo by Pope Pius IX, was consecrated in St. Patrick's Cathedral, New York City, on Sunday, October 17 and arrived in Buffalo on October 22, 1847.

In 1849, Bishop Timon moved into the Webster House on Franklin Street. Always concerned with vocations to the priesthood, he established in the rectory a seminary for three young men. The seminary was named St. Joseph's College because of a special veneration the bishop held for St. Joseph. Its early history was a varied one, as it moved from one location to another in several areas of the city.

Later in 1850., Bishop Timon asked the Oblates of Mary Immaculate to staff the seminary in his residence. On July 2, 1851, the Oblates arrived and opened a school chartered on March 12, 1851, under the name "The Buffalo College of St. Joseph," which Bishop Timon said, "...exists for missionary and no other purpose." In August 1861, six Christian Brothers from New York and Montreal arrived in Buffalo and settled at 187 Terrace Street. Brother Crispian, Director of this first Christian Brothers' community in Buffalo, Brother Pompian (Sub-Director), Brothers Demedrian, Ptolemy, Benedict and one Brother whose religious name is unknown had come to the city in response to Bishop Timon's urgent plea for assistance in educating the Catholic youth of Buffalo.

The first building in which the Brothers taught was built by a local contractor, a Mr. Flanagan, at a cost of $7,000. Two departments were started in this first school on September 2, 1861: St. Joseph's Academy (a tuition school), with 130 boys registered, and St. Joseph's Free School, with 150 boys. The brick building was located opposite Union Terrace, which at that time was a beautiful park. The Free School was located on the first floor of the building, the academy on the second floor., and the Brothers dormitory on the third floor. This building, later known as "Old Cathedral Hall," was located at 1 Delaware Avenue.

In response to numerous requests from clergy and parents, and after being closed for two years, St. Joseph's College reopened in September 1893. Due to the railroad station at Union Terrace and the encroachment of business and manufacturing interests, the Delaware Avenue site was no longer a desirable one. For what they knew would be a temporary stay, the Brothers rented a two-story brick building at 473 Prospect Avenue near Jersey Street which housed about fifty pupils during each of the four years the school occupied it.

In 1897, the Brothers purchased property at 1238 Main Street near Bryant and moved the school to that location. Soon, because of its better location. as well as the good reputation of the Brothers as teachers, the school began to prosper. Although just 29 students graduated from the school in 1916, enrollment began increase rapidly after World War I.

Consequently, discussion began about a new and larger building farther from the center of the city. The proposed plan was to include three buildings: a general school building to accommodate 900 students, a gymnasium with three basketball courts and a seating capacity of 2000, and a faculty house with accommodations for thirty brothers. In addition, there were to be football and baseball fields, a quarter-mile cinder track, and facilities for other sports. In 1924, ten acres of land were purchased on Kenmore Avenue in the Town of Tonawanda, blocks from Village of Kenmore and on the border with North Buffalo. However, construction was delayed by inadequate transportation to the northern parts of the city, the Great Depression starting in 1929, and then World War II.

Finally, after the war, plans began in earnest for the new school on Kenmore Avenue. Brother Andrew of the Cross sponsored a drive to secure funds to commence the project. Ground was broken at the new location on March 1, 1949, and, on October 2 of that year, the cornerstone was blessed by Bishop John O'Hara. The first classes were held in the new building on April 19, 1950. The new building was dedicated on May 14, 1950.

In the years to follow, the new facility allowed for increases in both the size of the student body and the number of faculty members. Such facilities as a drafting room, photographic darkroom and a soda fountain were appealing to the students. The school also featured, according to news accounts of the day, such modern innovations" as a public address system linking the principal's office to all rooms of the school and green glass chalkboards, replacing the old familiar blackboards."

On November 16, 2006, it was announced that alumnus Jack Cullen had made a gift of $2 million to support construction of new science laboratories and classrooms, as well as the annual school musical. This gift, along with two other $1 million gifts from alumni, are the foundation for a $12 million capital campaign announced on May 15, 2007, to build new science laboratories, an athletic complex, and a new residence for the Christian Brothers on campus, as well as increasing the endowment for financial aid.

== Facilities ==
The campus of St. Joseph's Collegiate Institute (SJCI or St. Joe's) is located at 845 Kenmore Avenue in the town of Tonawanda and rests on 11.9 acres (48,000 m^{2}). There are three buildings on the grounds: the Academic Building, Field House, and Innovation Center. The Brothers Residence was torn down in 2008 and is now the site of The Cullen Center for Excellence in Science, which includes a new residence on the top floor.

Within St. Joseph's Collegiate Institute, there are two academic computer labs, a newly updated Computer Graphics Lab in the art wing, and a Music Lab that employs Mac and Windows computers. The library also contains workstations for internet access. The Fine Arts facility includes a fully functioning black-box theatre, band room and sound-proof practice facilities.

Athletics are also an integral part of the St. Joe's experience and students are able to take advantage of both indoor and outdoor facilities. A modern weight room, renovated in 2014, two gymnasiums, a field house, and the 183,961 square foot, all-weather artificial turf Robert T. Scott AFSC Athletic Field Complex comprise the facilities of the athletic department. The Cullen Center for Excellence in science building was finished in fall 2009 and is presently in use. Classes include lab stations, smartboards and a work area for each student.

== Sports ==
St. Joseph's Collegiate Institute offers an extensive athletic program. St. Joe's has won the Supremacy Cup, recognizing the top overall athletic program in the Monsignor Martin Athletic Association's AA League, 31 times in the 58 years of the league's existence.

The Marauders' main rival is Canisius High School.

== Arts ==
St. Joseph's Collegiate Institute offers an academic and extracurricular arts curriculum encompassing visual arts, vocal music, instrumental music, and theater arts. Extracurricular offerings include the Swing Choir, Jazz Lab Band, a fall drama production, and an annual spring musical.

The St. Joe's Swing Choir is a show choir featuring boys from the school and girls from surrounding schools. They strive to serve the community and perform at local hospitals, nursing homes, and schools, often during the Christmas season. In addition to this they perform in a different city each year, going on "tour" to spread their music to other communities. To raise funds for this tour, they perform a "Dessert Show" for the St. Joe's community.

Similar to the Swing Choir, the Jazz Lab Band performs in the local community, however they perform at different venues such as local bars and community events. They take a trip every year, typically to a place important to the jazz tradition such as New Orleans. To raise funds for this trip, they perform and host a "Dinner Dance" for the St. Joe's Community.

St. Joseph's Collegiate Institute's theater program is well regarded for their consistent and skilled actors, crew, and pit orchestra featuring male students from the school and female students from surrounding schools. In addition to the two school run productions, the school gives the students an opportunity to produce a student-run production. The student-run production is typically of an established work, but in 2024 it was an original musical written and composed by the students.

The school musicals in particular have been well regarded, most recently the schools production of Guys and Dolls by Frank Loesser won the top award at the first annual Shea's High School Musical Theater Awards, the Outstanding Production of a Musical Gold Award.

== Notable alumni ==
- Rick Azar – sportscaster on WKBW-TV
- Michael A. Caligiuri - noted cancer researcher, President City of Hope National Medical Center, elected to the United States National Academy of Medicine in 2018.
- Craig Cirbus – former University at Buffalo head football coach
- Jimmy Collins – first player selected to the Baseball Hall of Fame primarily as a third baseman
- Don Criqui – football commentator for CBS Sports and the University of Notre Dame and member of the Pro Football Hall of Fame
- Sandro DeAngelis - retired Canadian Football League placekicker
- William "Wild Bill" Joseph Donovan – lawyer, general and founder of the Office of Strategic Services, awarded the Congressional Medal of Honor, "founder" of the CIA
- Eugene M. Fahey – Judge of the New York Court of Appeals
- Matt Fleckenstein - Emmy Award-nominated Writer/Producer; creator of the Nickelodeon comedy series Nicky, Ricky, Dicky & Dawn
- James Brendan Foley - Retired U.S. Diplomat/Foreign Service Officer
- Dennis Gilbert (ice hockey) – Professional ice hockey defenseman with the Ottawa Senators of the National Hockey League
- John Patrick Hopkins – mayor of Chicago (1893–95)
- Eugene F. Jankowski - Retired President & Chairman, CBS Broadcast Group
- Chad Kelly – American football quarterback
- Bryan Knight - Former National Football League linebacker for the Chicago Bears
- David Leggio - Professional ice hockey goaltender and United States Olympian
- John Maggio (director) - Emmy Award-Winning Executive Producer/Writer/Director
- Christopher Markus – Emmy Award-winning screenwriter, best known for The Chronicles of Narnia: The Lion, the Witch and the Wardrobe, Captain America: The First Avenger, The Life and Death of Peter Sellers and Avengers: Infinity War
- Jaylen Morris - Professional basketball player who has played for the Atlanta Hawks and Milwaukee Bucks
- Vaughn Parker – Former NFL tackle, San Diego Chargers and Washington Redskins
- Bill Paxon – U.S. Representative, 1989-99
- Carmen A. Puliafito – Former Dean, Keck School of Medicine at the University of Southern California
- James Edward Quigley – Archbishop of Chicago (1903–15)
- Naaman Roosevelt – Wide Receiver, Buffalo Bills (2010–11)
- Sean Ryan – tight end, National Football League (2004–09)
- George Scherger - Former Professional Baseball Player, Coach and Manager, Los Angeles Dodgers and Cincinnati Reds Systems
- Cole Schneider – hockey player, Milwaukee Admirals
- William F. Sheehan – Lawyer, politician; Lieutenant Governor of New York (1892–94)
