= Diocese of Buffalo =

Latin Catholic jurisdiction in New York, US

Coordinates: 42°54′17″N 78°50′58″W

Diocese of Buffalo Diœcesis Buffalensis
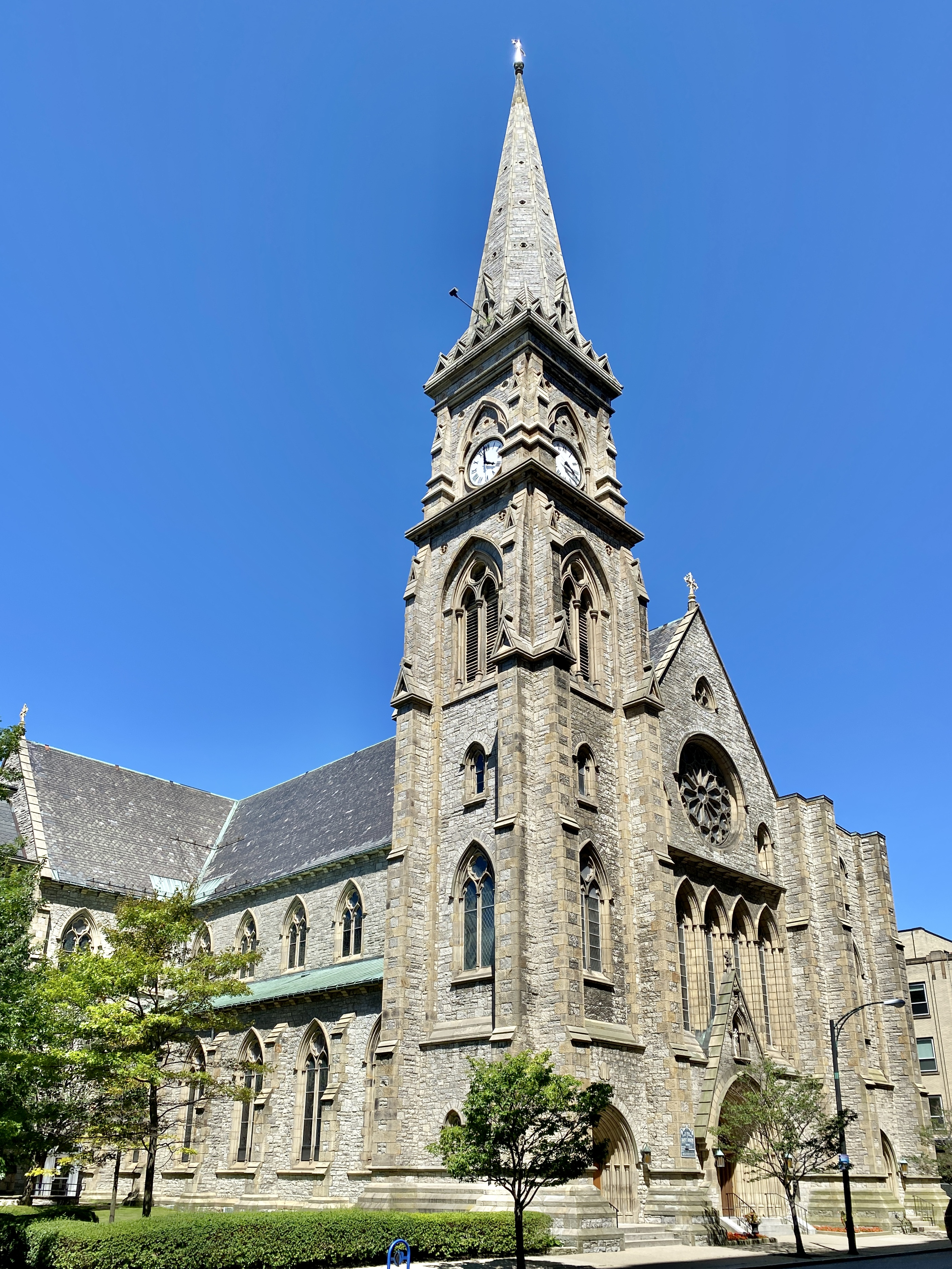
- St. Joseph Cathedral

- Coat of arms

Location
- Country: United States
- Territory: Western New York (Counties of Erie, Niagara, Genesee, Orleans, Chautauqua, Wyoming, Cattaraugus, and Allegany, New York)
- Ecclesiastical province: Archdiocese of New York
- Headquarters: 795 Main Street; Buffalo, New York; 14203

Statistics
- Area: 16,511 km^{2} (6,375 sq mi)
- Population: Total; Catholics: (as of 2018); 1,527,681; 727,125 (47.6%)
- Parishes: 161

Information
- Denomination: Catholic
- Sui iuris church: Latin Church
- Rite: Roman Rite
- Established: April 23, 1847; 179 years ago
- Cathedral: St. Joseph Cathedral
- Patron saint: Saint Joseph

Current leadership
- Pope: Leo XIV
- Bishop: Michael William Fisher
- Metropolitan Archbishop: Ronald Hicks
- Bishops emeritus: Richard Joseph Malone; Edward M. Grosz

Map
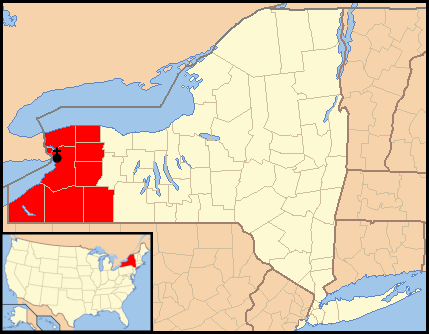

Website
- www.buffalodiocese.org

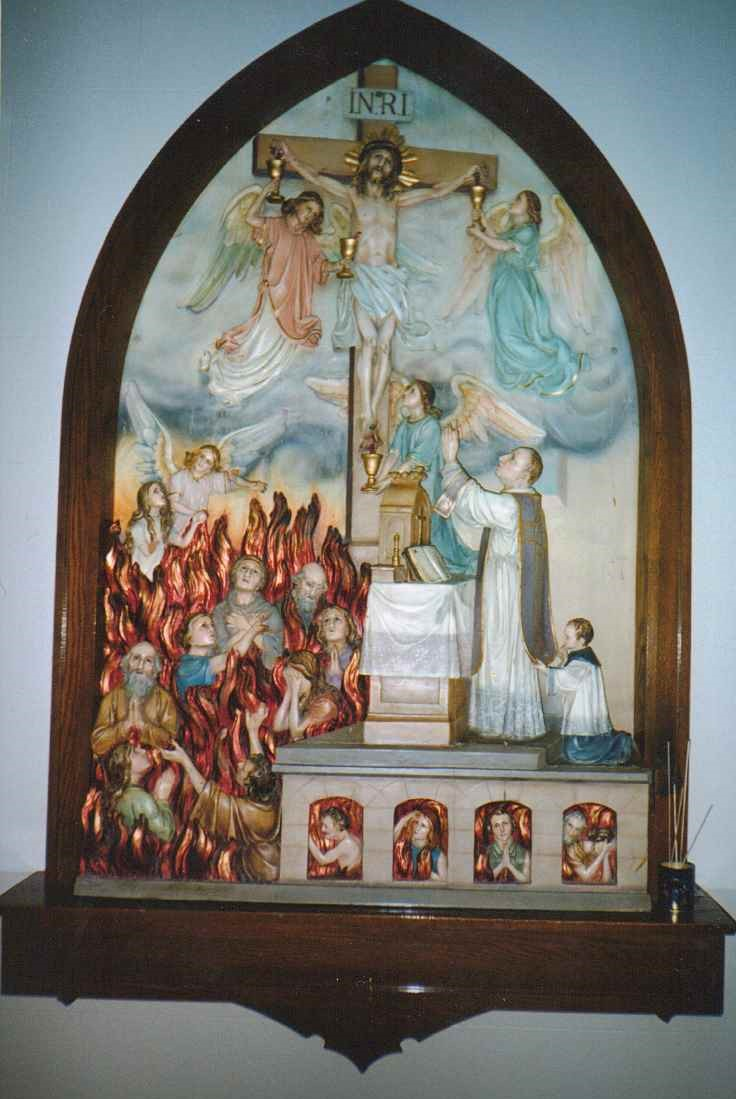
Religious artifact, St. Columban Retreat Center, Derby, New York (1998)

The Diocese of Buffalo (Latin: Diœcesis Buffalensis) is a diocese of the Catholic Church in Western New York in the United States. It is a suffragan diocese within the metropolitan province of the Archdiocese of New York. It was erected in 1847 and includes eight counties. The mother church is St. Joseph Cathedral in Buffalo. Michael Fisher is the bishop.

== Range and population ==
The Diocese of Buffalo covers 6,455 square miles (16,720 km^{2}).

== History ==
=== 1600 to 1800 ===
In 1678, Louis Hennepin, accompanying French explorer René-Robert La Salle, celebrated the first mass in present day Buffalo.

During the British rule of the Province of New York in the 18th century, Catholics were banned from the colony. Richard Coote, the first colonial governor, passed a law at the end of the 17th century that mandated a life sentence to any Catholic priest. The penalty for harboring a Catholic was a £250 fine plus three days in the pillory. In 1763, Catholic bishop Richard Challoner of London stated that:

“...in New York, one may find a Catholic here and there, but they have no opportunity of practicing their religion as no priest visits them, and … there is not much likelihood that Catholic priests will be permitted to enter these provinces."

Anti-Catholic bias in New York abated during the American Revolution when Catholic France provided its support to the American rebels. After the approval of the New York Constitution in 1777, freedom of worship for Catholics was guaranteed. This was soon followed by the same guarantee in the US Constitution.

In 1784, the Vatican erected the Prefecture Apostolic of United States of America, covering the entire new nation. This action was necessary to remove the American church from British jurisdiction. The Vatican in 1789 converted the prefecture into the Diocese of Baltimore. It was the first diocese in the United States, covering the entire country.

=== 1800 to 1830 ===
In 1808, as the population of the country grew, the Vatican created several new dioceses, including the Diocese of New York. Western New York and the Southern Tier would be part of the Diocese of New York, followed by the Archdiocese of New York, for the next 39 years.

By 1820, many Catholic Alsatians had moved to Western New York. The Diocese of New York had few priests in region; resident Catholics might not see a priest for weeks or months. Some Catholics would travel with their children to Albany or Michigan to have them baptised. Most of the time, they would wait to receive sacraments until a priest showed up in their town.

Bishop John Connolly of New York sent Patrick Kelly on a trip to Buffalo in 1821 to minister to these people. He celebrated one mass in a small building in the city.

Stephen Badin, a missionary from Kentucky, spent six weeks in Buffalo as the guest of Louis Le Couteulx, a French businessman. Badin celebrated public masses at Le Couteulx's home, urging the attendees to form a congregation. Le Couteulx donated a site for construction of a church, cemetery, and rectory. He later donated land for the Deaf Mute Institute, the Infant Asylum, Immaculate Conception Church, and the Buffalo orphan asylum.

=== 1830 to 1847 ===
After visiting Buffalo in 1829, Bishop John Dubois of New York sent John Mertz to Buffalo to become its first resident priest, assisted by Alexander Pax. Mertz in 1832 constructed the Lamb of God Church, the first Catholic church in the city. Over the next five years, Mertz formed congregations in Lancaster, Williamsville, North Bush, East Eden, and Lockport.

Dubois sent Mertz to Europe to raise funds for the diocese and dispatched John Neumann to Buffalo in 1836 to assist Pax. Based out of Williamsville, Neumann served in the Erie County for four years. He walked many miles over rough roads and through woods carrying his vestments, to minister to parishioners.

Bernard O'Reilly ministered to laborers on the Erie Canal and in constructing the canal locks at Lockport. Thomas McEvoy of Java worked with Catholics in Allegany, Wyoming, Steuben, and Chautauqua counties in the Southern Tier of New York.

In 1837, the English-speaking parishioners at Lamb of God withdrew from the church as it was primarily a German-speaking parish. They formed a separate congregation, renting the second floor of a building in Buffalo where Charles Smith celebrated mass once a month. The congregation later purchased property to build their own church.

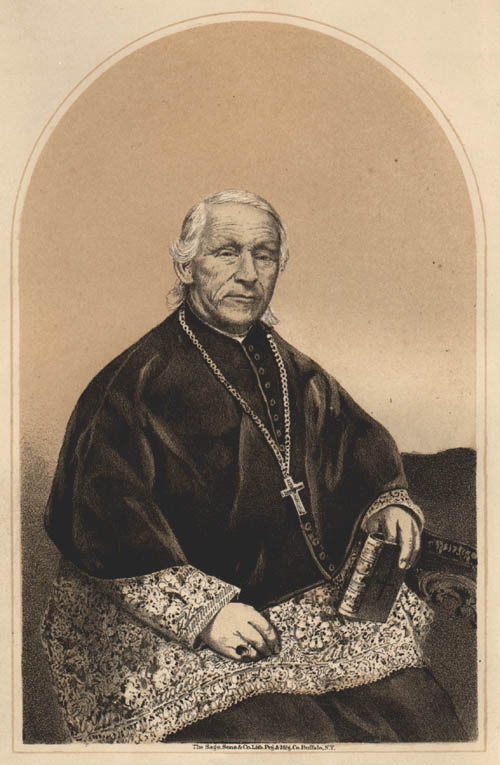
Bishop Timon (1870)

=== 1847 to 1867 ===
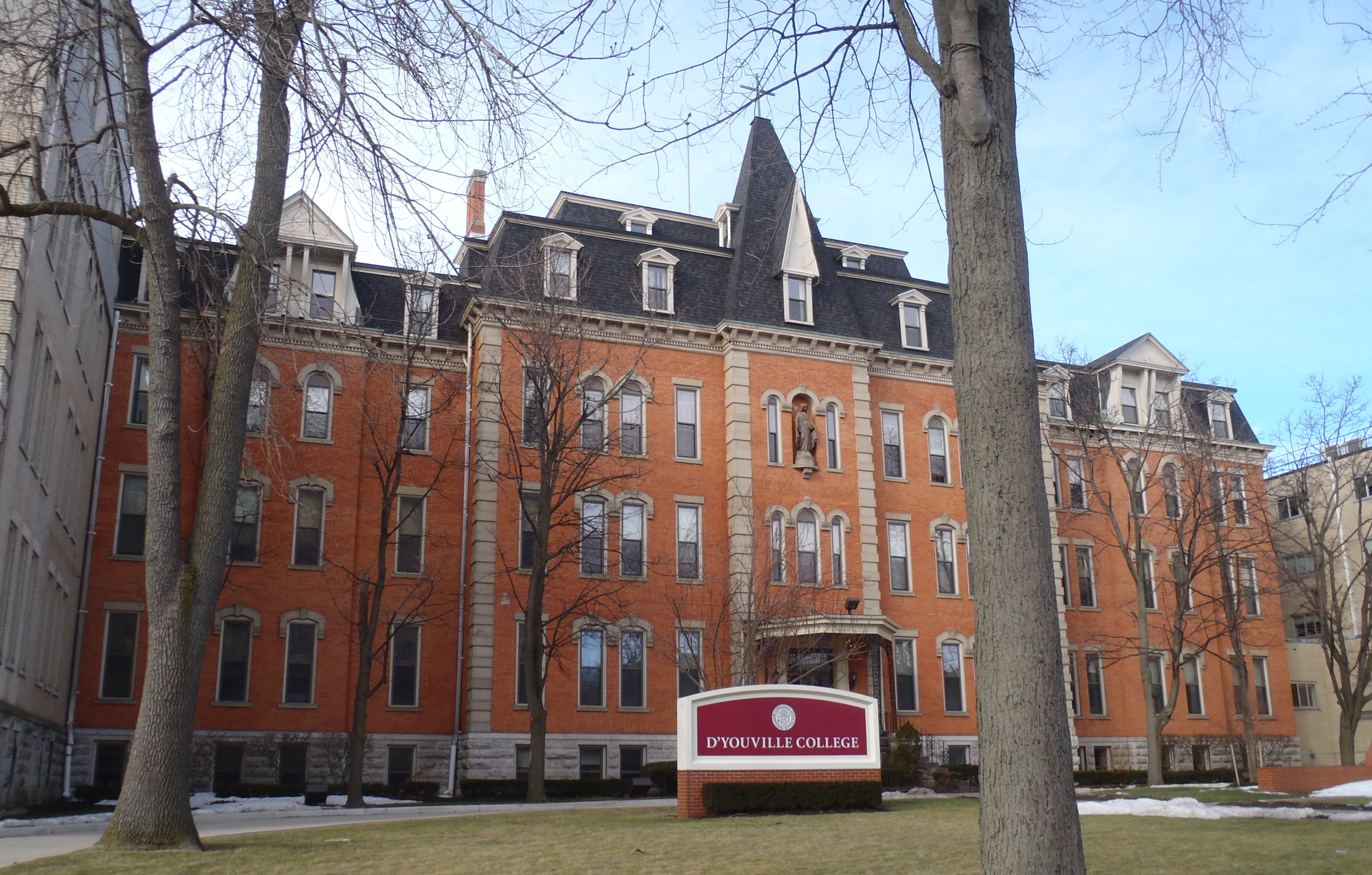
D'Youville University, Buffalo, New York (2014)

In 1847, Pope Pius IX erected the Diocese of Buffalo, taking its territory from the Archdiocese of New York. He appointed John Timon as its first bishop. Timon was fluent in Gaelic, which helped him minister to the Irish community in Buffalo. He appointed O'Reilly as his vicar general. The diocese rented several buildings near construction sites in the region to serve their workers. In 1848, the Sisters of Charity Order opened the first public hospital in Buffalo, Sisters of Charity Hospital.

Timon laid the cornerstone of St. Joseph Cathedral in 1851. During its construction, a storm destroyed several homes in the area. Timon allowed displaced families to set up tents in the shelter of the cathedral's walls for several weeks. The cathedral was usable, but not complete, when it was dedicated in 1855. In 1851, Lucas Caveng, a German Jesuit, founded St. Michael's Church in Buffalo.

The Oblate Fathers in August 1851 founded a seminary and college in Buffalo. The financial Nicholas Devereux established St. Bonaventure College in Allegheny in 1855 as a Franciscan college for men. Today it is St. Bonaventure University. In 1856, the Vincentian Order founded Our Lady of the Angels Seminary in Lewiston. Today it is Niagara University.

In 1861, the Sisters of St. Francis of Philadelphia established a Home for the Aged. Two years later, the sisters in Buffalo formed a separate congregation, the Sisters of St. Francis Third Order Regular of Buffalo. The Grey Nuns order in 1865 founded The Holy Angels Infirmary Academy for girls in Buffalo; today it is D'Youville University. In 1870, the Jesuit Order founded Canisius College in Buffalo to educate the sons of German immigrants.

=== 1867 to 1900 ===
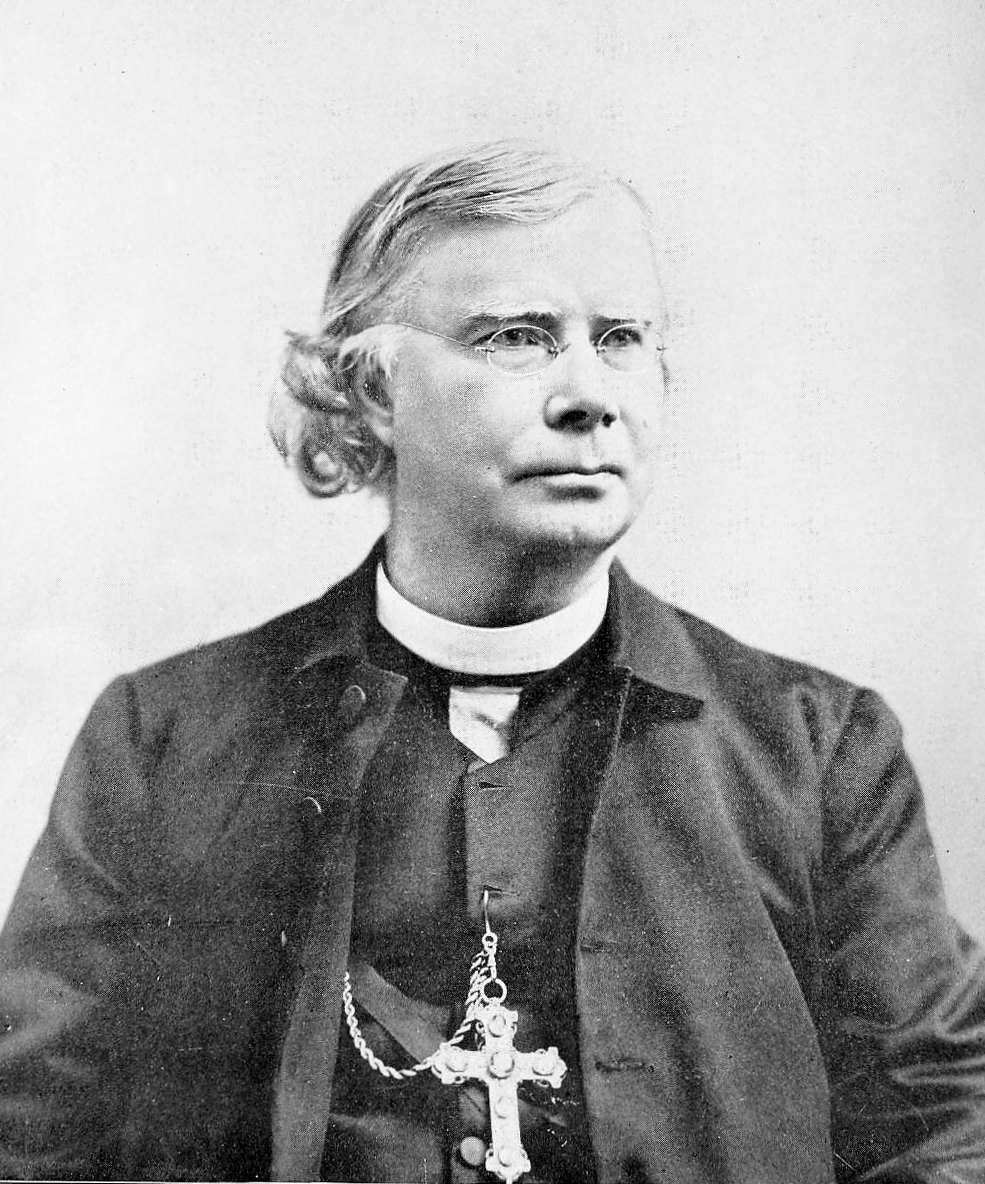
Bishop Ryan (1896)

After Timon's death in 1867, Pope Pius IX named Stephen V. Ryan from the Archdiocese of Philadelphia as the second bishop of Buffalo. That same year, the pope erected the Diocese of Rochester, taking the eastern counties from the Diocese of Buffalo. Ryan unified the Catholic school system in the diocese and established a commission to supervise it. He founded the diocesan newspaper, The Catholic Union. Ryan died in April 1896. Soon after his death, the diocese moved the four Southern Tier counties (Steuben, Schuyler, Chemung, and Tioga) from the Diocese of Buffalo to the Diocese of Rochester. In December 1896, Pope Leo XIII appointed James Edward Quigley as bishop of Buffalo.

In 1899, the Longshoremen's Union, representing 1,500 workers in Buffalo who hauled grain out of grain ships into the grain silos, went on strike against the Lake Carriers Association. The Association paid these men through saloon keepers, who would subtract charges for room, board and drinks from the workers' wages, leaving them very little. When the saloon keepers raised their fees, the workers went on strike. Quigley opened St. Bridget Church as a base for the strikers, gave them strategic support, and acted as a mediator. The strike ended when the carriers agreed to pay their workers directly.

=== 1900 to 1930 ===
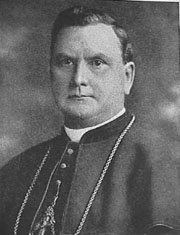
Archbishop Quigley (1896)

In 1902, Quigley embarked on a public campaign against what he termed "socialism" in labor unions in Buffalo. He claimed that Catholic workers felt that some union regulations were unjust and oppressive. Quigley wrote a pastoral letter in German to be read in ethnic German parishes that called on union members to assert their rights regarding union governance. He also spoke at mass meetings. While claiming to support the union movement, Quigley denounced socialism and gave his interpretation of why the Catholic Church opposed it. As a result of his anti-socialism campaign in Buffalo, Quigley gained a national reputation. In 1905, Quigley became archbishop of the Archdiocese of Chicago.

The fourth bishop of Buffalo was Charles H. Colton of New York, selected in 1903 by Pope Leo XIII. During his tenure, the diocese had 72 churches, 18 combination school-churches, 30 schools, 12 academies, 13 hospitals and charitable institutions, six convents, and 28 rectories. In 1904, the Sisters of Mercy opened Mercy Hospital to serve residents of the south side of Buffalo.

After Colton died in 1915, Pope Benedict XV named Bishop Dennis Dougherty from the Diocese of Jaro in the Philippines as Colton's successor in Buffalo. At the time of Dougherty's arrival, the diocese was burdened with a $1.6 million debt from the construction of the new cathedral. He dramatically reduced the debt by taxing the diocese's parishes according to their means. During his tenure, he also established 15 new parishes and supported the World War I effort through liberty bond campaigns and Red Cross drives. In 1918, Dougherty became archbishop of Philadelphia.

Benedict XV in 1919 appointed William Turner as the next bishop of Buffalo. 1922, Turner helped lay the cornerstone of the Basilica of Our Lady of Victory in Lackawanna. Turner was a supporter of the Society of Saint Vincent de Paul, and in 1924 began a Catholic Charities chapter in Buffalo. He established more than 30 new parishes during his administration, including Our Lady of Czestochowa Parish in North Tonawanda.

=== 1930 to 1970 ===
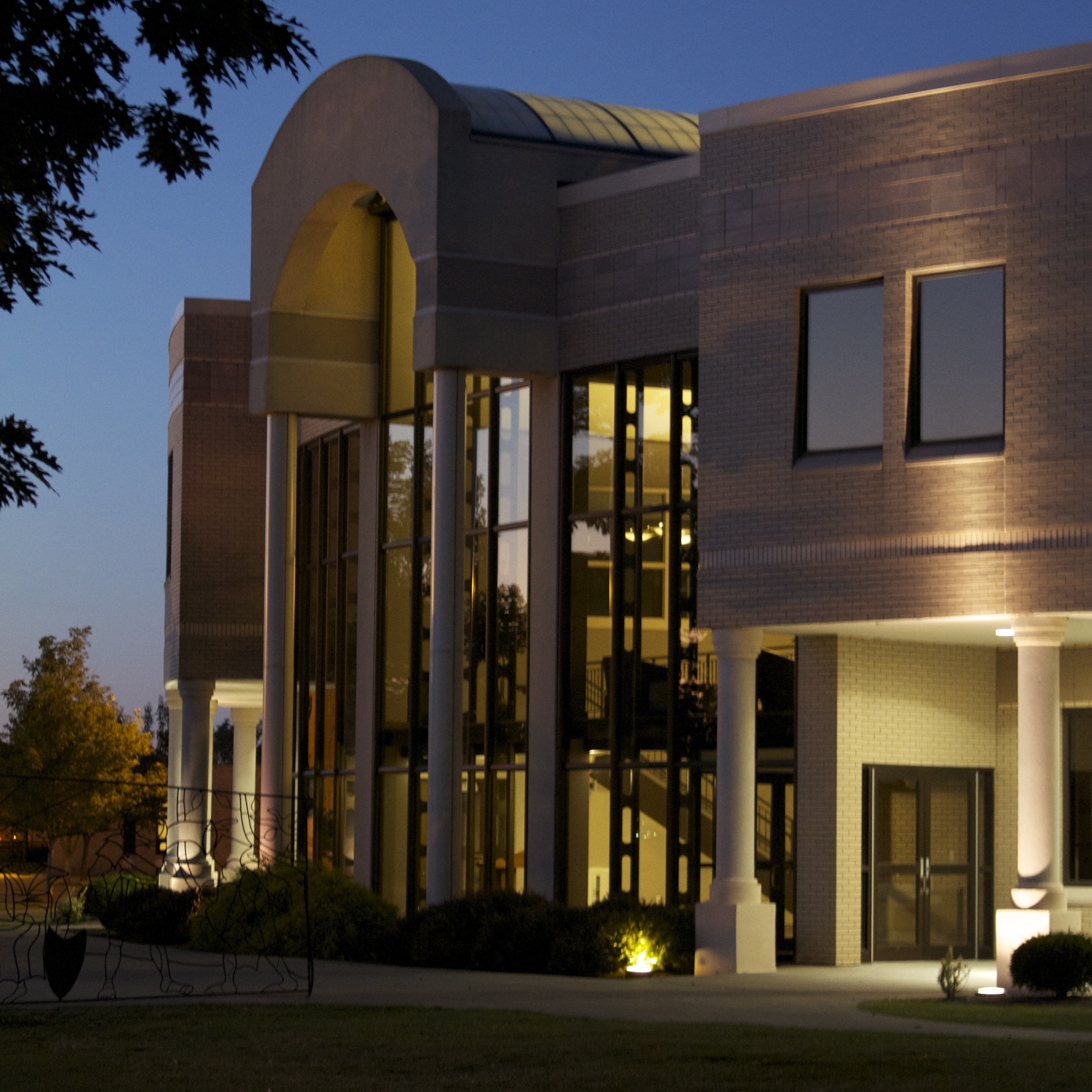
Hilbert College, Hamburg, New York

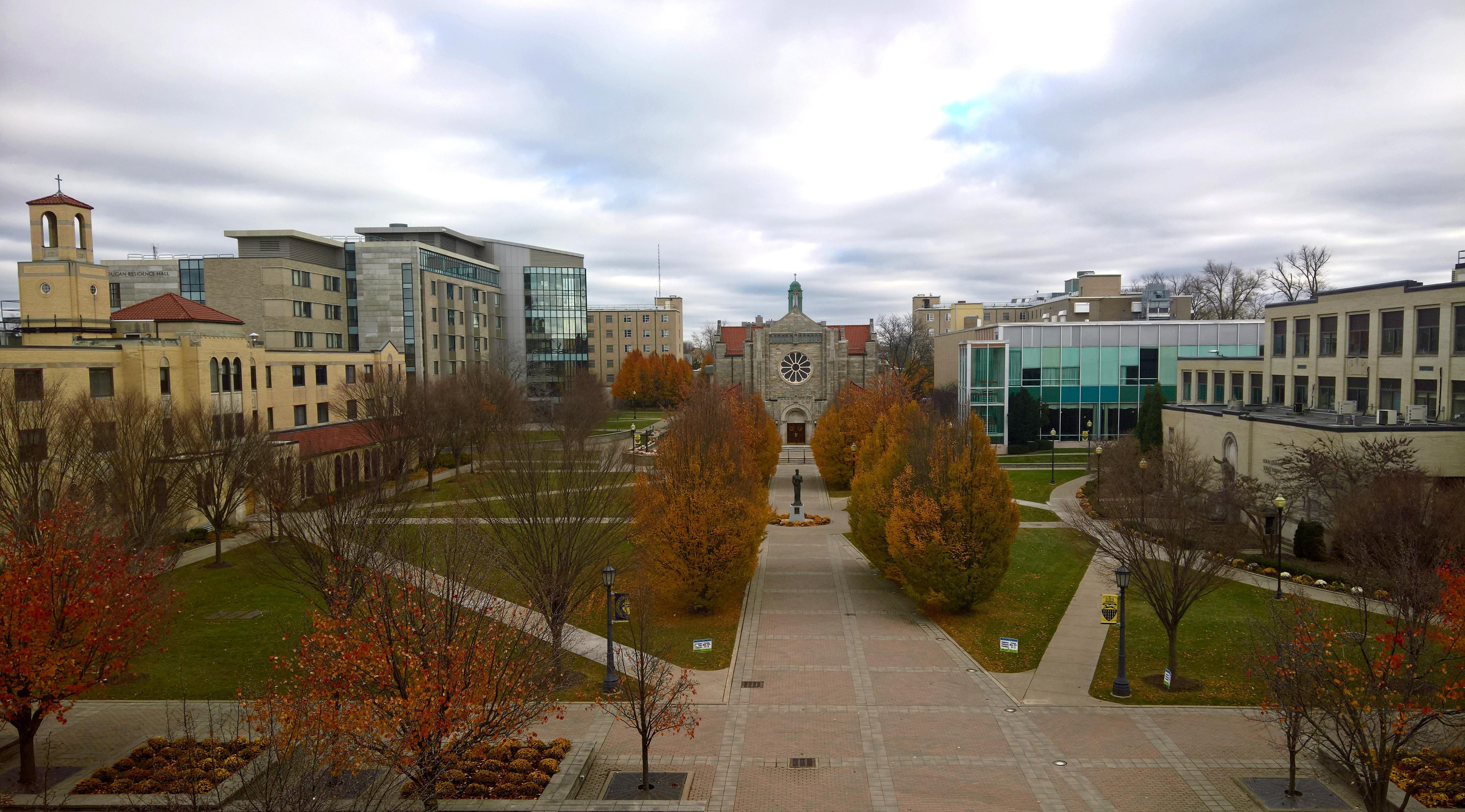
Canisius College, Buffalo, New York (2016

Turner died in 1937. His successor was Bishop John A. Duffy from the Diocese of Syracuse, appointed by Pope Pius XI that same year. During his tenure, Duffy established the Diocesan Fund for the Faith for those impacted by the Great Depression and erected parishes in rural areas of the diocese. He organized the Catholic Youth Organization, the Bishop's Committee for Christian Home and Family, the Confraternity of Christian Doctrine, and Newman Clubs at the local universities. Duffy died in 1944.

Pope Pius XII selected Auxiliary Bishop John O'Hara of the United States Military Ordinariate as the next bishop of Buffalo in 1945. O'Hara expanded Catholic education in the diocese, and eliminated racial segregation in schools and churches. He became archbishop of Philadelphia in 1951. To replace O'Hara, Pius XII in 1952 named Auxiliary Bishop Joseph A. Burke, the first native of the diocese to become its bishop.

During his 10-year-long administration, Burke supported Holy Name Society, missions, the Pre-Cana program, Puerto Rican migrants, and displaced persons. He also continued the expansion and construction of educational institutions, including St. John Vianney Seminary in East Aurora, New York.

In 1957, the Franciscan Sisters of St. Joseph founded Hilbert College in Hamburg to train its novices to become teachers. It is today a coed Liberal Arts college. The Sisters of Mercy opened Trocaire College in Buffalo in 1958 to provide college courses for religious sisters.

After Burke died in 1962, Pope John XXIII in 1963 appointed Bishop James A. McNulty from the Diocese of Paterson as the tenth bishop of Buffalo. He reduced the diocesan debt, which was approximately $30 million, through a three-year Diocesan Development Fund. McNulty oversaw the implementation the Second Vatican Council reforms in the diocese, including the establishment of a priests' senate. McNulty promoted religious vocations and expanded inner city ministry. He established the Liturgical Commission, the Pastoral Council, a lay steering committee to oversee finances, and the Communications Office. McNulty began the television program The Bishop Visits Your Home.

=== 1970 to 2010 ===
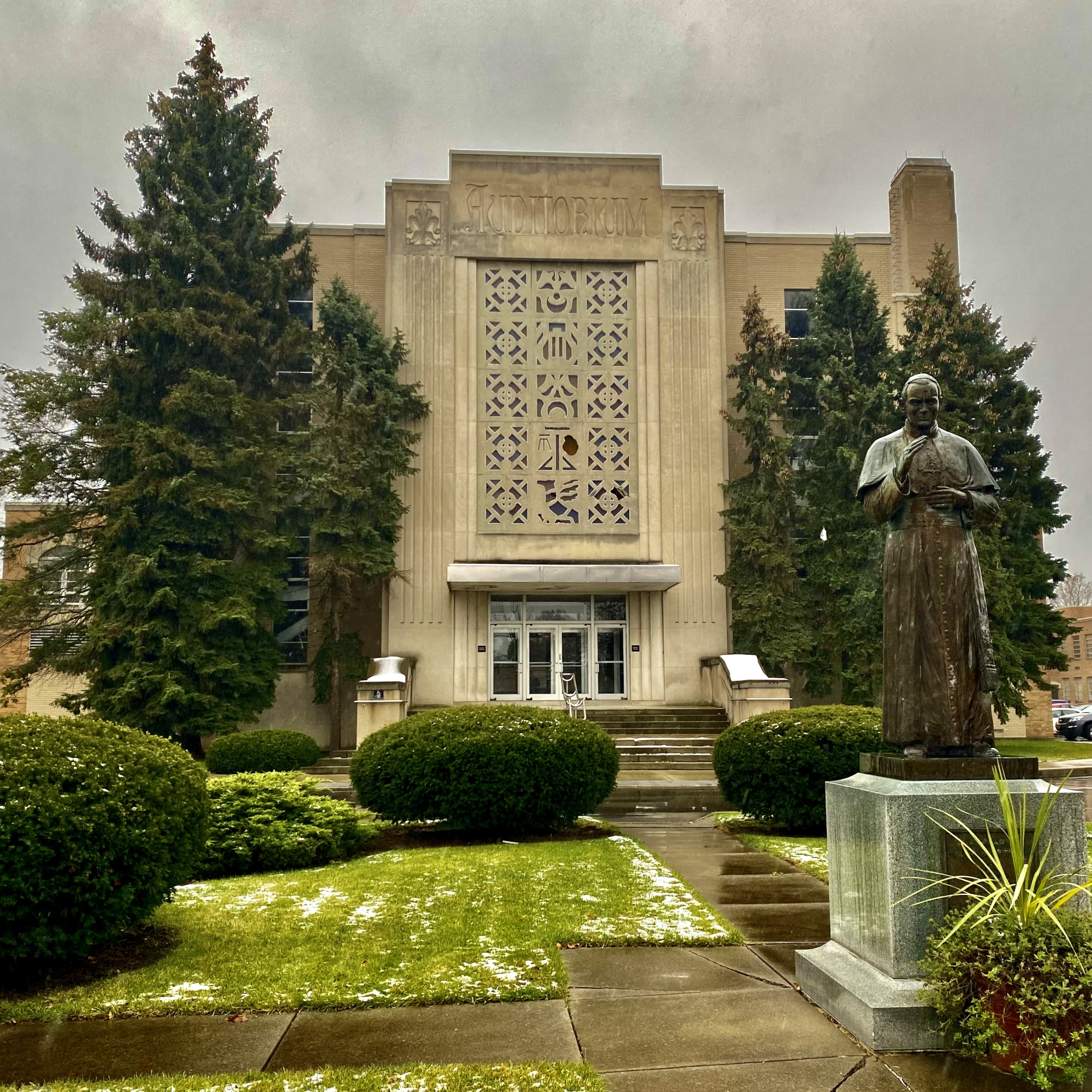
Villa Maria College, Cheektowaga, New York (2021)

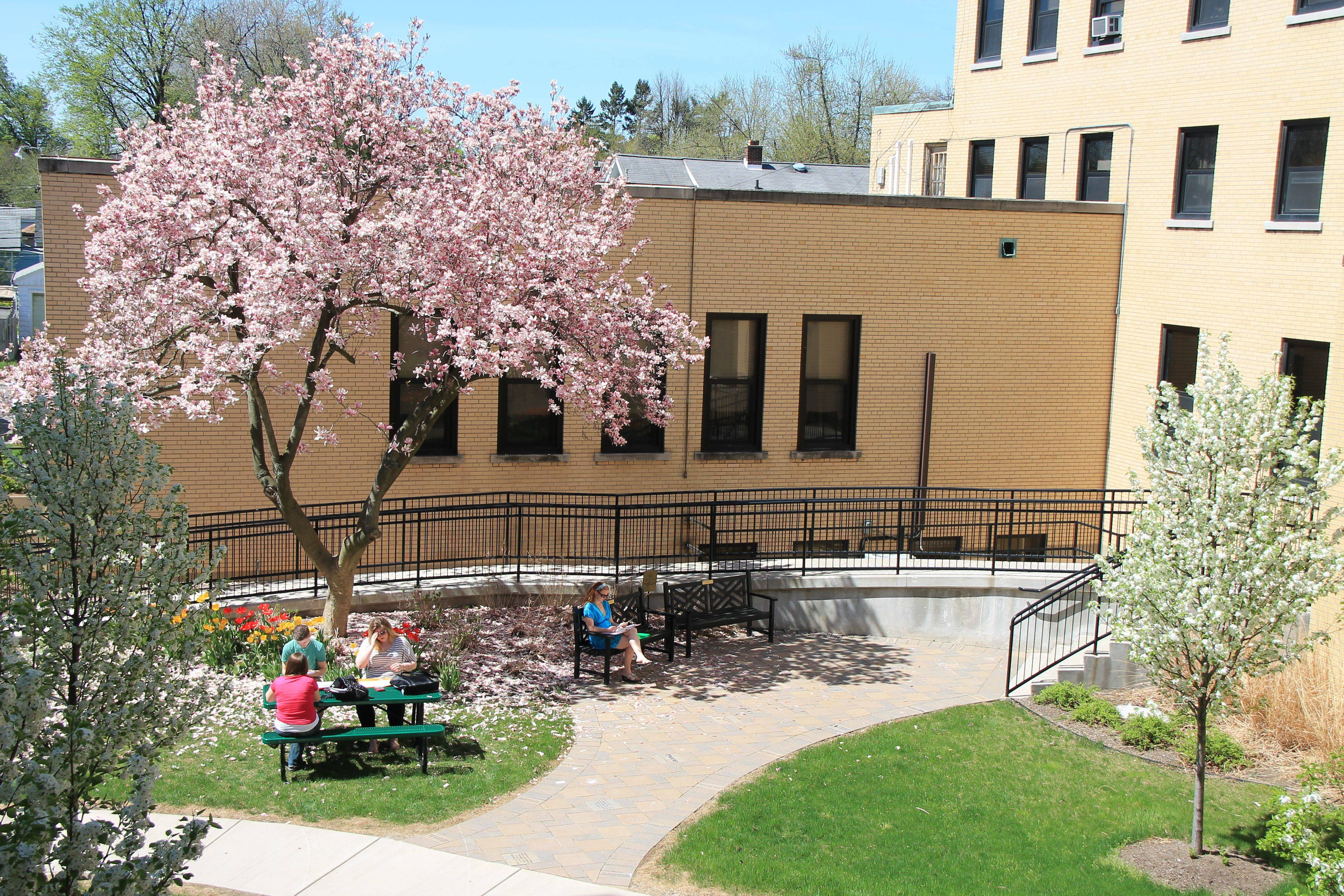
Trocaire College, Buffalo, New York (2017)

McNulty died in 1972; Pope Paul VI then appointed Auxiliary Bishop Edward D. Head of New York as the next bishop of Buffalo. Head established the Religious Education Coordinators Council, the Priests' Retirement Board, the Center for Church Vocations, the Western New York Catholic Hospital Health Care Council, the Peace and Justice Commission, the Office of Vicar for Religious and the Permanent Diaconate Program. In February 1986, priest Gerald C. Jasinski, after accusations of sexually assaulting two teenage boys in Sheldon, was charged with first-degree sodomy, first-degree sexual abuse and unlawful dealing with a child. He pleaded guilty to misdemeanor sexual assault in August 1986, receiving five years probation, and he was laicized. Head ordained 124 priests and confirmed 50,000 people during his 22 years in Buffalo. Head retired in 1995.

Pope John Paul II appointed Auxiliary Bishop Henry J. Mansell of New York as the twelfth bishop of Buffalo in 1995. Mansell established the Catholic Health Care System of Western New York, combining the local Catholic hospitals, nursing homes, and other health care facilities. In 1996, he instituted the diocese's vicariate structure and in 1997 celebrated the diocese's 150th anniversary. He instituted a televised "Daily Mass" celebrated from a chapel at St. Joseph Cathedral. Mansell became archbishop of the Archdiocese of Hartford in 2004.

To replace Mansell in Buffalo, John Paul II appointed Bishop Edward Kmiec from the Diocese of Nashville as the next bishop of Buffalo. In 2007, Kmiec announced that the diocese had a balanced budget, after spending cuts reduced a $2.1 million deficit from the previous year.

In August 2009, the Buffalo News reported the removal of Fred R. Voorhes as administrator of St. Teresa's Parish in South Buffalo and the subsequent dismissal of Marc J. Pasquale, as its business administrator and director of religious education. Parishioners expressed in interviews their discontent with these removals. Pasquale had gone to the Erie County District Attorney's Office prior to his dismissal to raise concerns about questionable financial practices in the diocese.

=== 2010 to present ===
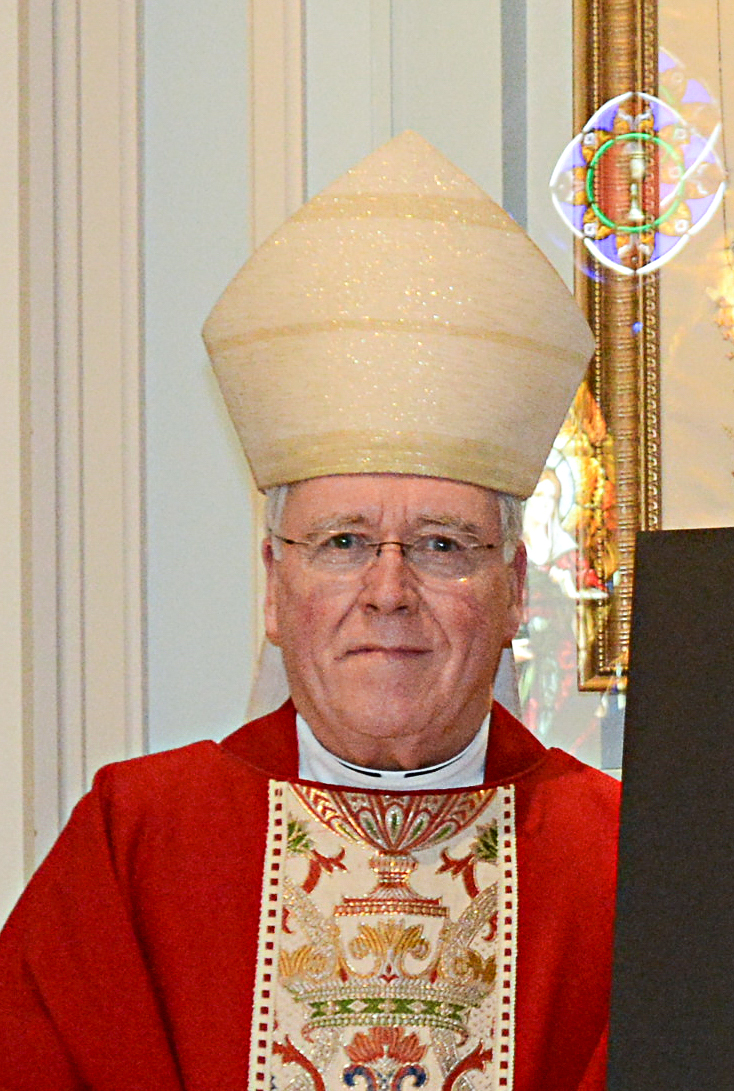
Bishop Malone (2017)

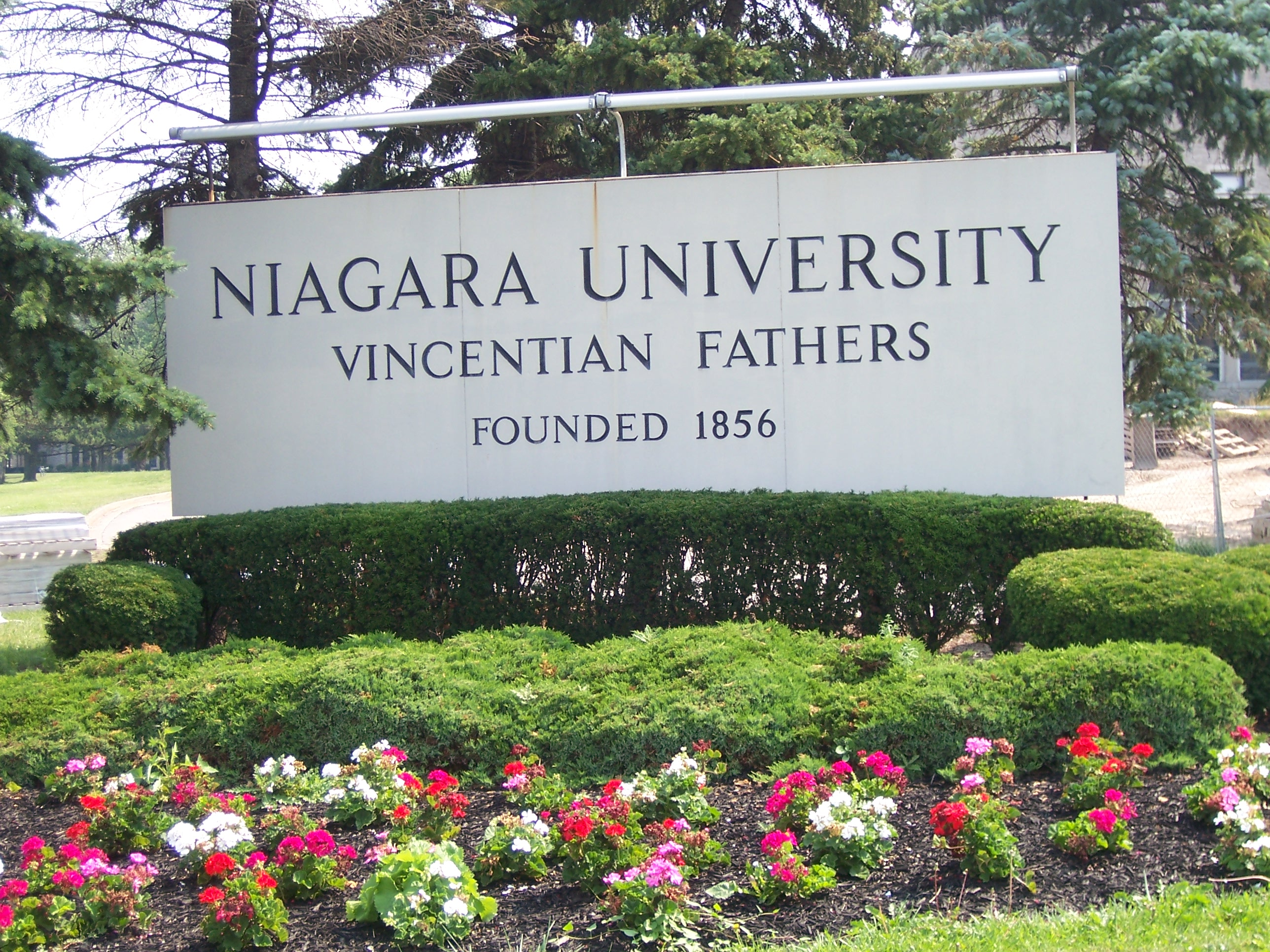
Niagara University, Lewiston, New York (2008)

Kmiec was heavily criticized for downsizing the diocese from 274 parishes and missions in 2005 to 170 in 2011. He also oversaw the closures of 25 elementary schools. During his tenure, Kmiec ordained only 18 priests from 2004 to 2011. He retired in 2012.

Bishop Richard Malone of the Diocese of Portland succeeded Kmiec the same year. In 2015, he issued a letter condemning the 2015 film Fifty Shades of Grey. In his statement, Malone spoke of "the moral reprehensibility of all domestic violence and sexual exploitation." In September 2018, a diocesan database showed over 106 clergy with credible accusations of sexually abusing children; the diocese had previously reported 42 clergy in March 2018. Officials explained that the March list reflected "priests against whom we had substantiated allegations – meaning more than one allegation – and were accused of abusing minors, not adults." A few active clergy on the list were suspended. In September 2018, Malone named Steven L. Halter, a former FBI investigator, as director of the diocese's newly created Office of Personal Responsibility, tasked with handling sex abuse complaints.

In May 2019, the diocese announced that its voluntary compensation program had paid $17.5 million to 106 childhood victims of clergy sexual abuse; the diocese had rejected 135 applicants. By September 2019, 100 individuals had filed sexual abuse lawsuits against the diocese. That same month, the diocese published an Adult Sexual Misconduct Policy and Procedures and a new Code of Pastoral Conduct for Clergy. After the apostolic visitation in October 2019, Malone retired in December 2019. The same month, leaked audio recordings of Malone revealed that he had diverted 40 percent of donations sent to Catholic Charities in the diocese to a foundation known as "The Bishop's Fund for the Faith." The foundation was included in the diocese's budget as a separate corporate entity, which would protect the money from lawsuits and bankruptcy filings.

In October 2019, the Congregation for Bishops in Rome assigned Bishop Nicholas DiMarzio from the Diocese of Brooklyn to lead an apostolic visitation, or investigation, of the Diocese of Buffalo. After the visitation, Pope Francis accepted Malone's resignation as bishop in December 2019. The television program 60 Minutes Overtime reported that month that Malone's resignation was linked to documents leaked in 2018 by his executive assistant, Siobhan O'Connor, detailing his concealment of sexual abuse by priests.

With Malone gone, the pope named Bishop Edward B. Scharfenberger from the Diocese of Albany as apostolic administrator. In February 2020, the diocese filed for bankruptcy as a result of the numerous sexual abuse lawsuits. Christ the King Seminary in East Aurora was closed in 2020. Mary McCarrick became the diocese's first chief operating officer in 2020. In February 2020, the diocese filed for Chapter 11 bankruptcy amid numerous sex abuse lawsuits. In April 2020, Bishop Scharfenberger, the apostolic administrator of the diocese, revealed that as part of the bankruptcy agreement, the diocese would halt cash payments and benefits to 23 diocesan priests suspended due to sex abuse allegations. The same month, in response to the statute of limitations extions of sex abuse lawsuits in New York, the diocese filed an adversary motion to freeze the lawsuits, stating that it could not pay settlements if the lawsuits continued.

To replace Malone, Francis in December 2020 named Auxiliary Bishop Michael Fisher from the Archdiocese of Washington as the new bishop of Buffalo.

In March 2024, the diocese agreed to sell at least 22 properties, including its headquarters, for $9.8 million as part of its bankruptcy agreement. As of 2023, Fisher is the current bishop of Buffalo.

== Territories ==
The Diocese of Buffalo includes the following eight counties in Western New York:

- Allegany
- Cattaraugus
- Chautauqua
- Erie
- Genesee
- Niagara
- Orleans
- Wyoming

== Bishops ==
Bishop Colton (1915)

=== Bishops of Buffalo ===
1. John Timon, C.M. (1847–1867)
2. Stephen V. Ryan, C.M. (1868–1896)
3. James Edward Quigley (1897–1903), appointed Archbishop of Chicago
4. Charles H. Colton (1903–1915)
5. Dennis Joseph Dougherty (1915–1918), appointed Archbishop of Philadelphia (elevated to Cardinal in 1921)
6. William Turner (1919–1936)
7. John Aloysius Duffy (1937–1944)
8. John Francis O'Hara, C.S.C. (1945–1951), appointed Archbishop of Philadelphia (elevated to Cardinal in 1958)
9. Joseph Aloysius Burke (1952–1962)
10. James Aloysius McNulty (1963–1972)
11. Edward Dennis Head (1973–1995)
12. Henry Joseph Mansell (1995–2003), appointed Archbishop of Hartford
13. Edward Urban Kmiec (2004–2012)
14. Richard Joseph Malone (2012–2019)
15. Michael William Fisher (2021–present)

=== Former auxiliary bishops ===
- Joseph Aloysius Burke (1943–1952), appointed Bishop of Buffalo
- Leo Richard Smith (1952–1963), appointed Bishop of Ogdensburg
- Pius Anthony Benincasa (1964–1986)
- Stanislaus Joseph Brzana (1964–1968), appointed Bishop of Ogdensburg
- Bernard Joseph McLaughlin (1969–1988)
- Donald Walter Trautman (1985–1990), appointed Bishop of Erie
- Edward M. Grosz (1990–2020)

=== Other diocesan priests who became bishops ===
- Francis Xavier Krautbauer, appointed Bishop of Green Bay in 1875
- Thomas J. Walsh, appointed Bishop of Trenton in 1918 and later Bishop and Archbishop of Newark
- Edmund F. Gibbons, appointed Bishop of Albany in 1919
- John Joseph McMahon, appointed Bishop of Trenton in 1928
- James Johnston Navagh, appointed Auxiliary Bishop of Raleigh in 1952 and later Bishop of Ogdensburg and Bishop of Paterson
- Celestine Joseph Damiano, appointed Apostolic Delegate to South Africa and Titular Archbishop in 1952 and later Archbishop (personal title) of Camden
- John Joseph Fitzpatrick (priest here, 1942–1948), appointed Auxiliary Bishop of Miami in 1968 and later Bishop of Brownsville
- Robert Joseph Cunningham, appointed Bishop of Ogdensburg in 2004 and later Bishop of Syracuse

== Major ministries ==
- Campus Ministries
- Catholic Charities
- Holy Name Society
- St. Vincent de Paul Society
- Office of Pro-Life Ministries

== Institutions ==
=== Catholic Health ===
Catholic Health is a non-profit organization sponsored by the Diocese of Buffalo and the Franciscan Sisters of St. Joseph that operates the following hospitals in Western New York:

- Kenmore Mercy Hospital – Kenmore
- Lockport Memorial Hospital – Lockport
- Mercy Hospital of Buffalo – Buffalo
- Mount St. Mary's Hospital – Lewiston
- Sisters of Charity Hospital – Buffalo
- Sisters of Charity Hospital, St. Joseph Campus – Buffalo

=== Convents ===
- Convent of the Franciscan Sisters of St. Joseph – Hamburg
- Villa Maria Motherhouse Complex, also known as the Felician Sisters Immaculate Heart of Mary Convent Chapel and Convent – Cheektowaga
- Sisters of St. Francis of Penance and Christian Charity at Stella Niagara Education Park, Stella Niagara, Lewiston

== Education ==
=== Colleges and universities ===
- Canisius University, Buffalo
- D'Youville University, Buffalo
- Hilbert College, Hamburg
- Niagara University, Lewiston
- St. Bonaventure University, St. Bonaventure
- Trocaire College, Buffalo
- Villa Maria College of Buffalo, Buffalo

=== High schools ===
As of 2025, the Diocese of Buffalo operates 13 high schools:

- Archbishop Walsh Academy, Olean
- Bishop Timon – St. Jude High School, Buffalo
- Buffalo Academy of the Sacred Heart, Amherst
- Canisius High School, Buffalo
- Cardinal O'Hara High School, Tonawanda
- Chesterton Academy of Buffalo, Lancaster
- Mount Mercy Academy, Buffalo
- Mount Saint Mary Academy, Kenmore
- Nardin Academy, Buffalo
- Notre Dame High School, Batavia
- Saint Francis High School, Athol Springs
- St. Joseph's Collegiate Institute, Buffalo
- St. Mary's High School, Lancaster

=== Elementary schools ===
As of 2025, there are 34 Catholic primary schools in the Diocese of Buffalo.

=== School restructuring ===
In 2007, the diocese closed 14 Catholic schools.

According to the diocese, in 2007 the average cost of teaching a student in the 14 schools was $4,738 while the schools only received an average tuition per student of $1,525. To assist parishes who had run out of money to support their schools, the diocese had contributed millions of dollars. In 2007, the diocese had a $2.1 million deficit, due in part to the school subsidies.

Many of the 14 schools had experienced declines in enrollment. Cheektowaga, which lost five schools in 2007, had suffered a large decline in its Catholic family population. One of its schools, Infant of Prague School, had an enrollment of 1,120 students in 1960. By 2007, the school had only 117 students. In Depew, St. Barnabas School had only 57 students enrolled in 2007.
