= Mount Mercy Academy (Buffalo, New York) =

Location
- 88 Red Jacket Parkway; Buffalo, (Erie County), New York 14220; United States; 42°50′44.5″N 78°48′43.5″W

Information
- Type: Private, All-Female
- Religious affiliation: Roman Catholic
- Established: 1904
- Founder: Sisters of Mercy
- Head of school: Michele (Sixt) Melligan
- Staff: 15
- Faculty: 28
- Grades: 9-12
- Average class size: 16
- Student to teacher ratio: 10:1
- Colors: Blue and White and Gold
- Team name: Magic
- Accreditation: Middle States Association of Colleges and Schools
- Newspaper: Merciette
- Yearbook: Mercienne
- Website: https://www.mtmercy.org

Mount Mercy Academy is a private, Roman Catholic high school in Buffalo, New York within the Diocese of Buffalo.

== Background ==
Mount Mercy Academy was established in 1904 by the Sisters of Mercy.

== Academics ==
In 2018, Mount Mercy Academy was ranked 9th out of 135 Western New York high schools in terms of academic performance.

== Athletics ==
- Cross Country
- Soccer
- Volleyball
- Golf
- Basketball
- Softball
- Lacrosse
- Tennis
- Track and Field
- Bowling
- Cheerleading
- Ice Hockey
- Rowing/Crew

== Student organizations ==
- Art Club
- Anti-Bullying Society
- Drama Club
- Environmental Awareness Club
- Foreign Language Club
- Madrigal Art and Literary Calendar
- Magic Belles
- McAuley Scholars
- Mercienne (Yearbook)
- Merciette (School Newspaper)
- Mercy Speaks
- Mock Trial
- Model UN
- National Honor Society
- Oratory and Debate
- Pure Magic
- Students Against Destructive Decisions (S.A.D.D.)
- Ski Club
- Student Ambassadors
- Student Government
- Student Relations Board
