= Chesterton Academy of Buffalo =

Location
- 5337 Genesee Street, Lancaster, NY 14086; United States
- 42°51′11.9″N 78°45′23.9″W

Information
- Type: Private
- Motto: Cultura vitae (The culture of life)
- Opened: 2014
- Closed: Still operating
- School district: Lancaster
- CEEB code: 335921
- Headmaster: Lauri Hahn
- Faculty: About 13, most half time.
- Grades: 9-12
- Enrollment: 30
- Campus size: medium
- Campus type: clean, one-story detached building on a large campus
- Colors: Navy Blue and Gold
- Team name: The Chesterton knights
- Student to teacher ratio: 2:1
- Religious affiliation: Roman Catholic
- Website: https://buffalochestertonacademy.org

Chesterton Academy of Buffalo is a private, co-educational, Catholic secondary school in Lancaster, New York. It is located in the Roman Catholic Diocese of Buffalo.

Launched in the fall of 2014 by Michael P. McKeating, a Catholic deacon, who received the inspiration while on a pilgrimage to Rome for the election of Pope Francis. There he encountered the students of the original Chesterton Academy in Edina, Minnesota, according to the testimony of the founder. It is centered on G. K. Chesterton's ideas of integrated learning.

Beginning in the 2015–16 school year, Chesterton Academy moved from its former location into the premises of Fourteen Holy Helpers R.C. Church in West Seneca. In 2020 it moved to the current site on Genesee Street in Lancaster, New York.
