= James A. McNulty =

American clergyman

His Excellency, The Most Reverend James Aloysius McNulty
- Bishop of Buffalo; Titular Bishop of Methone
- Church: Catholic
- See: Diocese of Buffalo
- In office: February 12, 1963 to September 4, 1972
- Predecessor: Joseph A. Burke
- Successor: Edward D. Head
- Other posts: Titular Bishop of Methone; Bishop of Paterson (1953 to 1963); Auxiliary Bishop of Newark (1947–1953)

Orders
- Ordination: July 12, 1925 by Antoine Alphonse de Wachter
- Consecration: October 7, 1947 by Thomas Walsh

Personal details
- Born: January 16, 1900 New York City, US
- Died: September 4, 1972 (aged 72) Montclair, New Jersey, US
- Education: Seton Hall College; Immaculate Conception Seminary; Catholic University of Leuven
- Motto: Ad Jesus per Mariam (To Jesus through Mary)

Styles of James Aloysius McNulty
- Reference style: His Excellency; The Most Reverend
- Spoken style: Your Excellency
- Religious style: Bishop

James Aloysius McNulty (January 16, 1900 – September 4, 1972) was an American clergyman of the Catholic Church. He served as bishop of the Diocese of Paterson in New Jersey (1953–1963) and bishop of the Diocese of Buffalo in New York (1963–1972). He previously served as an auxiliary bishop of the Archdiocese of Newark in New Jersey (1947–1953).

== Biography ==
Ordination history of James A. McNulty
History
Episcopal consecration
- Consecrated by: Thomas Walsh (Newark)
- Date: October 7, 1947
Episcopal succession
Bishops consecrated by James A. McNulty as principal consecrator
- Pius Anthony Benincasa: June 29, 1964
- Stanislaus Joseph Brzana: June 29, 1964

=== Early life and education ===
James McNulty was born on January 16, 1900, in New York City. He was educated at Seton Hall College and Immaculate Conception Seminary in South Orange, New Jersey, where he earned a Master of Arts degree in 1923. He made his theological studies at the Catholic University of Leuven in Leuven, Belgium.

=== Ordination and ministry ===
McNulty was ordained to the priesthood in Leuven by Bishop Antoine Alphonse de Wachter for the Archdiocese of Newark on July 12, 1925. His younger brother, John L. McNulty, was ordained at the same liturgy (and later served as President of Seton Hall University from 1949 to 1959).

James McNulty did pastoral work in Jersey City and Newark, both in New Jersey, and served as diocesan director of the Confraternity of Christian Doctrine, moderator of the Mount Carmel Guild, and director of Catholic Youth Organization. He served on the faculty of the Teachers' Institute for Religious for five years.

=== Auxiliary Bishop of Newark ===
On August 2, 1947, McNulty was appointed auxiliary bishop of Newark and titular bishop of Methone by Pope Pius XII. He received his episcopal consecration on October 7, 1947, from Archbishop Thomas Walsh at the Cathedral of the Sacred Heart in Newark, with Bishops William A. Griffin and Henry Joseph O'Brien serving as co-consecrators.

=== Bishop of Paterson ===
McNulty was named the third bishop of Paterson by Pius XII on April 9, 1953. His tenure there was marked by an increase in new parishes and schools. He also served as chairman of the U.S. Bishops' Committee for Motion Pictures, Radio and Television; in this capacity he condemned "'fast buck' horror, pseudoscience and crime films aimed especially at youngsters," saying such films imperil the moral health and intellectual development of children.

=== Bishop of Buffalo ===
On February 12, 1963, Pope John XXIII appointed McNulty as the tenth bishop of Buffalo. He reduced the diocesan debt which stood at $30 million through a three-year Diocesan Development Fund.

McNulty oversaw the reforms from the Second Vatican Council of the 1960s, including the establishment of the Priests' Senate. A good number of new parishes were established and former Missionary Apostolate parishes became independent. Many parishes built new church buildings. McNulty promoted religious vocations, expanded inner city ministry, established the Liturgical Commission, the Pastoral Council, a Lay Steering Committee to oversee finances, and the Communications Office. McNulty began the television program The Bishop Visits Your Home.

=== Death ===
James McNulty died in Montclair, New Jersey, on September 4, 1972, at age 72. His body is buried next to his parents in East Hanover, New Jersey.

== Episcopal succession ==
Catholic Church titles
Preceded by –	Auxiliary Bishop of Newark; October 7, 1947 – April 9, 1953	Succeeded by –
Preceded by Thomas Aloysius Boland	Bishop of Paterson; April 9, 1953 – February 12, 1963	Succeeded by James Johnston Navagh
Preceded by Joseph A. Burke	Bishop of Buffalo; February 12, 1963 – September 4, 1972	Succeeded by Edward D. Head
