= James Edward Quigley =

Canadian-born American Catholic prelate (1854–1915)

His Excellency, The Right Reverend James Edward Quigley
- Archbishop of Chicago
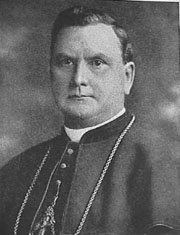
- Church: Latin Church
- Archdiocese: Chicago
- Appointed: January 8, 1903
- Installed: March 10, 1903
- Term ended: July 10, 1915
- Predecessor: Patrick Feehan
- Successor: George Mundelein
- Previous post: Bishop of Buffalo

Personal details
- Born: October 15, 1854 Oshawa, Ontario, Canada
- Died: July 10, 1915 (aged 60) Rochester, New York, US
- Education: College of Propaganda; University of Innsbruck; Our Lady of Angels Seminary; St. Joseph's College
- Motto: Ite ad Joseph (Go to Joseph)
- Coat of arms

Ordination history
History
Priestly ordination
- Ordained by: Raffaele Monaco La Valletta
- Date: April 13, 1879
- Place: Rome
Episcopal consecration
- Principal consecrator: Michael Corrigan
- Co-consecrators: Bernard John McQuaid, Charles Edward McDonnell
- Date: February 24, 1897
- Place: St. Joseph Cathedral, Buffalo, Diocese of Buffalo
Episcopal succession
Bishops consecrated by James Edward Quigley as principal consecrator
- Paul Peter Rhode: 1908
- Henry John Althoff: 1914

James Edward Quigley (October 15, 1854 – July 10, 1915) was a Canadian-born American Catholic prelate who served as archbishop of Chicago in Illinois from 1903 to 1915. He previously served as bishop of Buffalo in New York State from 1897 to 1903.

== Biography ==
=== Early life and education ===
James Quigley was born on October 15, 1854, in Oshawa, Canada West (now the province of Ontario). He was the son of James and Mary Lacey Quigley, whom immigrated to Canada around 1849 from the Kingdom of Ireland. The family moved to the United States in 1856, settling in Lima, New York. At age ten, James Quigley was sent to live with his uncle, Reverend Edward Quigley, the rector of Immaculate Conception Parish in Buffalo, New York. As a young man, James Quigley worked as a dock worker in Buffalo.

After graduating from St. Joseph's College in Buffalo in 1872, Quigley passed an entrance examination for the United States Military Academy in West Point, New York. However, he soon decided to enter the priesthood instead. Quigley attended Our Lady of Angels Seminary at Niagara Falls, New York. He then went to Europe to study at the University of Innsbruck in Austria and College of Propaganda in Rome.

=== Ordination and ministry ===
While in Rome, Quigley was ordained a priest by Cardinal Raffaele Monaco La Valletta for the Diocese of Buffalo on April 13, 1879.

Following his return to New York, the diocese assigned Quigley as pastor of St. Vincent Parish in Attica. He left St. Vincent's in 1884 to become rector of St. Joseph's Cathedral Parish in Buffalo. He was transferred to St. Bridget's Parish in Buffalo in 1886.

Quigley preached in Latin, English, Italian and German. He was also conversant in French and Polish. He served for 12 years as the president of the Catholic Schools Board in Buffalo.

=== Bishop of Buffalo ===
On December 12, 1896, Pope Leo XIII appointed Quigley as bishop of Buffalo. Before his consecration, Quigley suffered an acute anxiety attack that he hid from others. He recovered in time for his consecration, but was to suffer from anxiety for years to come. Quigley was consecrated at St. Joseph Cathedral on February 24, 1897, by Archbishop Michael Corrigan.

In 1899, the Longshoremen's Union in Buffalo, representing 1,500 workers who scooped grain out of grain ships, went on strike against the Lake Carriers Association. The Association paid these men through the local saloon keepers, who would subtract fees from their pay for room, board and drinks, leaving the workers with very little. When the saloon keepers raised their fees, the workers went on strike. Quigley opened St. Bridget Church in Buffalo as a headquarters for the strikers, gave them strategic support, and acted as a mediator with the carriers. The strike finally ended when the carriers agreed to pay their workers directly.

In 1902, Quigley embarked on a public campaign against what he termed "socialism" in labor unions in Buffalo. He claimed that some union regulations were unjust and oppressive to Catholic workers. Quigley wrote a pastoral letter in German to the German parishes that called on union members to assert their rights regarding union governance. He also spoke at mass meetings. While claiming to support the union movement, Quigley denounced socialism and gave his interpretation of why the Catholic Church opposed it. As a result of his anti-socialism campaign in Buffalo, Quigley gained a national reputation.

=== Archbishop of Chicago ===
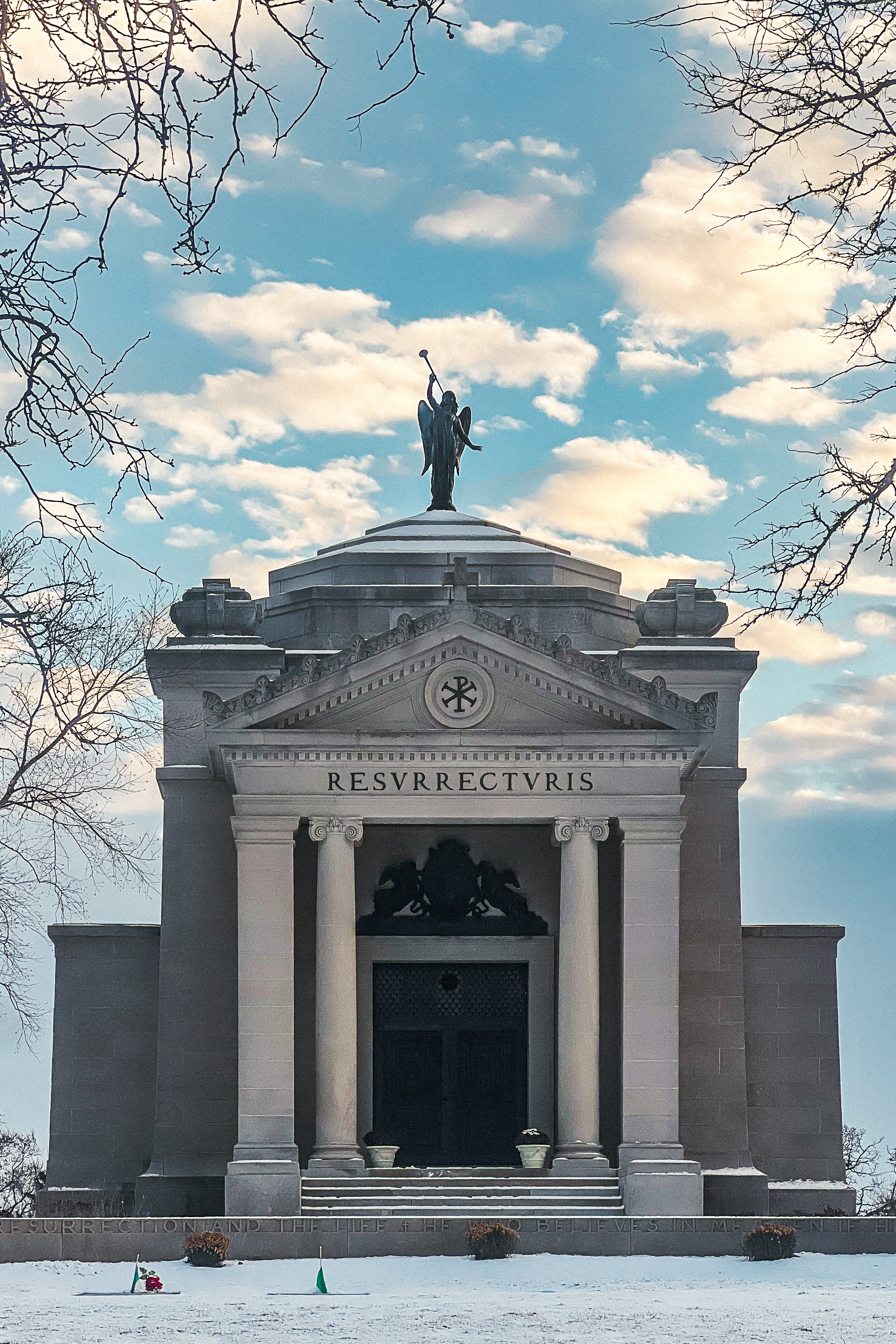
Bishop's Mausoleum, Mount Carmel Cemetery, Hillside, Illinois (2024)

Quigley was appointed archbishop of Chicago by Leo XIII on January 8, 1903, and was installed on March 10, 1903.

Quigley quickly realized that the rapidly expanding population in the archdiocese demanded more priests. In July 1903 he started planning a minor seminary that would provide high school and some college course for teenagers entering the priesthood.. Cathedral College of the Sacred Heart opened in Chicago in October 1905 with an enrollment of 52 seminarians. After Quigley's death, this minor seminary evolved into the Archbishop Quigley Preparatory Seminary. Quigley also bought property in Chicago for the future establishment of a major seminary for adult seminarians.

In 1905, Quigley asked Reverend John De Schryver, a professor at St. Ignatius College Prep in Chicago, to organize St. John Berchmans Parish for Belgian Catholic immigrants. He also organized national parishes for Italian and Lithuanian immigrants. The resulting parishes flourished as an "important spiritual, cultural, and educational component of Chicago's life."

Quigley was always interested in Catholic missions, both in the United States and abroad. In 1905 was one of the founders of the Catholic Extension Society, which would support mission churches throughout the country. Quigley hosted the first American Catholic Missionary Conference in Chicago in 1908.

In 1910, Quigley approached Reverend Francis X. McCabe, president of DePaul University, about the lack of higher education opportunities for Catholic women in the archdiocese. DePaul began admitting women the following year.

Quigley had commissioned in 1905 the construction of the Bishops' Mausoleum in Mount Carmel Cemetery in Hillside, Illinois. It was designed by the architect William J. Brinkmann, who planned several churches in Chicago. Completed in 1912, the mausoleum holds the remains of five bishops and archbishops of Chicago.

=== Death and legacy ===
In June 1915, in declining health, Quigley traveled to Rochester, New York, to stay with his brother while receiving medical treatment. James Quigley died in Rochester from what was called paralysis on July 10, 1915, at age 60. A 1915 resolution by the Chicago City Council named Quigley as;

"...one of those men who work quietly and behind the scenes, and who seek no public credit or applause for the work which they do; ...he spent himself...in particular in the service of the many and varied works of charity which have been founded..."

The Archbishop Quigley Center in Chicago, formerly the Archbishop Quigley Preparatory Seminary, is named in his honor. Bishop Quigley High School in Buffalo was named after him.

Catholic Church titles
Preceded by Patrick Augustine Feehan	Archbishop of Chicago; 1903–1915	Succeeded by George Mundelein
Preceded by Stephen V. Ryan	Bishop of Buffalo; 1897–1903	Succeeded by Charles H. Colton
