= Edward D. Head =

American prelate

His Excellency, The Most Reverend Edward Dennis Head
- Bishop of Buffalo; Titular Bishop of Ard Sratha
- See: Diocese of Buffalo
- Installed: 1973
- Term ended: 1995
- Predecessor: James A. McNulty
- Successor: Henry J. Mansell
- Previous posts: Auxiliary Bishop of New York (1970 to 1973)

Orders
- Ordination: January 27, 1945
- Consecration: March 19, 1970

Personal details
- Born: August 5, 1919 White Plains, New York, US
- Died: March 29, 2005 (aged 85) Kenmore, New York, US
- Buried: Buffalo, New York, US
- Denomination: Catholic
- Education: Columbia University; St. Joseph’s Seminary, New York School of Social Work
- Motto: Charity seeks not her own

Ordination history of Edward D. Head
History
Priestly ordination
- Ordained by: Francis Spellman
- Date: January 27, 1945
- Place: St. Patrick's Cathedral, New York, USA
Episcopal consecration
- Principal consecrator: Terence Cooke
- Co-consecrators: John Maguire, Edwin Broderick
- Date: March 19, 1970
- Place: St. Patrick's Cathedral, New York, USA
Episcopal succession
Bishops consecrated by Edward D. Head as principal consecrator
- Donald Walter Trautman: April 16, 1985
- Edward M. Grosz: February 2, 1990

Styles of Edward Dennis Head
- Reference style: His Excellency; The Most Reverend
- Spoken style: Your Excellency
- Religious style: Bishop

Edward Dennis Head (August 5, 1919 – March 29, 2005) was an American prelate of the Catholic Church. He served as the 11th bishop of the Diocese of Buffalo in New York State from 1973 to 1995. He previously served as an auxiliary bishop of the Archdiocese of New York in New York City from 1970 to 1973.

== Early life ==
Edward Head was born on August 5, 1919, in White Plains, New York, and was raised in the South Bronx neighborhood of New York City. His parents were Charles and Nellie Head, immigrants from England and Ireland, respectively. Head had two brothers, Charles and Daniel.

Both Head attended Catholic parochial schools in New York, then earned a mathematics degree from Columbia University in Manhattan. He entered St. Joseph's Seminary in Yonkers, New York, in 1939.

== Priesthood ==
Head was ordained a priest for the Archdiocese of New York on January 27, 1945, by Archbishop Francis Spellman at St. Patrick's Cathedral in Manhattan, New York City. Head earned a master's degree from the New York School of Social Work in Manhattan in 1948. He taught sociology at Notre Dame College on Staten Island before serving as assistant pastor at both Sacred Heart Parish in the Bronx and St. Roch's Parish on Staten Island.

In September 1947, Head became a staff member of the archdiocesan Catholic Charities Family Service Department. He served an assistant pastor at St. Veronica's Parish in Greenwich Village in New York City for 17 years while working at Catholic Charities.

Head was named associate director of Family Services in March 1948, serving in that capacity until he became director of social research for Catholic Charities in 1956. Pope John XXIII honored Head in July 1962 by naming him a papal chamberlain. In 1964, Head went to minister at St. Monica's Parish in Manhattan. In May 1966, Head was given the title of domestic prelate by Pope Paul VI.

In October 1966, Head was appointed executive director and secretary of Catholic Charities in the archdiocese by Cardinal Terence Cooke. In these capacities Head oversaw nearly 1,000 employees, and administered an annual budget of millions of dollars. Head became a parochial assistant at St. Patrick's Cathedral in 1967.

== Auxiliary Bishop of New York ==
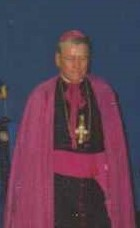
Bishop Head at University of Buffalo (1992)

Pope Paul VI appointed Head as an auxiliary bishop of New York and as titular bishop of Ard Sratha on January 27, 1970. On March 19, 1970, Head was consecrated at St. Patrick's Cathedral by Cardinal Terrence Cooke. Head served, among other assignments, as executive director of Catholic Charities in the archdiocese.

== Bishop of Buffalo ==
On January 23, 1973, Head was named as the 11th bishop of Buffalo by Paul VI; he was installed in Buffalo, New York, on March 19, 1973.

Fundraising for Catholic Charities strongly increased under Head's leadership, including the year of his retirement.

Head was involved in many activities as bishop of Buffalo. Under his leadership, many institutes and offices were created in the diocese. Many of these endeavors include the Religious Education Coordinators Council; the Priests' Retirement Board; the Center for Church Vocations; the Western New York Catholic Hospital Health Care Council; the Peace and Justice Commission; the Office of Vicar for Religious; and the permanent diaconate program.

Additional efforts included the Office of Vicar for Campus Ministry; the Organist Enrichment Program; the Diocesan Marian Commission; the Office of Vicar for the Central City; Daybreak Productions; the Catholic Charities Parish Outreach Program; the Little Portion Friary; the Pope John Paul II Residence; the Agenda for the 80's; the diocesan radio studio; and the Lay Ministry Advisory Board.

Further endeavors created and/or supervised by Head included the consolidation of the Catholic Education Department; the Renew Program; the Office of Church Ministry; the relocation and consolidation of diocesan offices in the Catholic Center; the Office of Black Ministry; the Hispanic Apostolate; the Commission on Women in the Church and Society; the Department of Pro-Life Activities; the New Visions Commission for Pastoral Planning; the reorganization of ten parishes in Buffalo.

In 1995, on the 50th anniversary of his ordination, Head reflected on his appointment as bishop of Buffalo:

In 1973, Pope Paul, VI, could have sent this church of Buffalo a wiser bishop, a holier bishop, a bishop more astute in administration, or a bishop more gifted in public speaking. But, I don't think Pope Paul could have sent the Diocese a bishop who had tried harder to love you and to serve you.

Head ordained 124 men to the priesthood during his time as bishop of Buffalo. Head reportedly confirmed 50,000 young people in Buffalo.

== Retirement and later life ==
Pope John Paul II accepted Head's petition to retire as bishop of Buffalo in April 1995. He continued to be active in health care and other ministries throughout his retirement.

Edward Head died on March 29, 2005, in Kenmore, New York, at age 85. Bishop Edward Kmiec was quoted in a March 30, 2005, Buffalo News article:

This is a day of tremendous sadness for the family of the Diocese of Buffalo. Bishop Head had a tremendous impact on the faith lives of Catholics in the eight counties of Western New York.

Head is buried in the crypt of St. Joseph Cathedral in Buffalo. He was the first bishop of Buffalo to have retired in Buffalo. The Bishop Edward D. Head Residence for retired clergy in Lackawanna, New York, is named after him

Catholic Church titles
Preceded by James A. McNulty	Bishop of Buffalo; 1973–1995	Succeeded by Henry J. Mansell
Preceded by Edwin Broderick	Auxiliary Bishop of New York; 1970–1973	Succeeded by Theodore Edgar McCarrick
