= Michael William Fisher =

American bishop of the Catholic Church

The Most Reverend Michael William Fisher
- Bishop of Buffalo
- Diocese: Buffalo
- Appointed: December 1, 2020
- Installed: January 15, 2021
- Predecessor: Richard Joseph Malone
- Previous post: Auxiliary bishop of Washington and Titular Bishop of Tronto (2018-2021)

Orders
- Ordination: June 23, 1990 by James Aloysius Hickey
- Consecration: June 29, 2018 by Donald Wuerl, Barry C. Knestout, Mario E. Dorsonville

Personal details
- Born: March 3, 1958 (age 68) Baltimore, Maryland, US
- Education: University of Maryland; Mount St. Mary's University
- Motto: "In faithfulness and love"

Styles of Michael William Fisher
- Reference style: His Excellency; The Most Reverend
- Spoken style: Your Excellency
- Religious style: Bishop

Michael William Fisher (born March 3, 1958) is an American prelate of the Catholic Church who has served as bishop of the Diocese of Buffalo in New York since 2021. He was previously an auxiliary bishop of the Archdiocese of Washington in the District of Columbia.

== Life and career ==
=== Early life ===
Michael Fisher was born on March 3, 1958, in Baltimore, Maryland, the eldest of five children. As a child, he delivered newspapers for The Baltimore Sun and worked at a gas station. Fisher attended Baltimore Polytechnic Institute and achieved the rank of eagle scout in the Boy Scouts of America.

After his high school graduation, Fisher attended the University of Maryland, earning a Bachelor of Science degree in business administration and accounting in 1984. He then worked as a comptroller for a psychiatric practice in Bethesda, Maryland. In 1986, he entered Mount St. Mary's University in Emmitsburg, Maryland.

=== Priesthood ===
Fisher was ordained a priest at St. Matthew’s Cathedral in Washington for the Archdiocese of Washington by Cardinal James A. Hickey on June 23, 1990.

After his ordination, the archdiocese assigned Fisher as parochial vicar at Sacred Heart Parish in La Plata, Maryland. He was moved in 1995 to Holy Family Parish in Hillcrest Heights, Maryland, to serve as pastor there. Four years later, the archdiocese transferred him to be pastor at St. John Neumann Parish in Gaithersburg, Maryland. Fisher was named a chaplain to His Holiness by Pope John Paul II in 2005.

In 2005, Archbishop Theodore McCarrick appointed Fisher as vicar general for the apostolates, in which role he oversaw the archdiocesan ministries for education, ethnic ministries, social justice and service, parish life and youth ministry. In 2006, Cardinal Donald Wuerl appointed Fisher as vicar for clergy and secretary for ministerial leadership.

Fisher served on the college of consultors, the priests council, the administrative board, the priest retirement board, the clergy personnel board, the deacon review board, the deacon council, the needy parish committee, and the Forward in Faith Committee.

=== Auxiliary bishop of Washington ===
Fisher's personal coat of arms

Pope Francis appointed Fisher as an auxiliary bishop of Washington on June 8, 2018. Fisher was consecrated at the National Shrine of the Immaculate Conception in Washington D.C. by Wuerl on June 29, 2018, with Barry C. Knestout and Mario E. Dorsonville as co-consecrators.

Fisher's coat of arms as an auxiliary referenced those of several past archbishops. The colors of red and gold were used in the coats of arms of archbishops Hickey, McCarrick, and Wuerl. The line embattled and red crosses reference the tower embattled and red cross in Wuerl's coat of arms. The lion, in addition to representing Fisher's patron saint, Mark the Evangelist, references the lion on Hickey's coat of arms.

=== Bishop of Buffalo ===
On December 1, 2020, Pope Francis named Fisher as Bishop of Buffalo. Fisher's installation occurred on January 15, 2021. Regarding the sex abuse allegations against priests in the diocese, Fisher made this statement:

“Trust has been broken. Because of the clergy abuse, as well as other things. I really feel we need to rebuild that trust through our actions. Part of that will be looking out for those who are vulnerable and in need of our healing. I want to be part of the healing process.”

== See also ==
- Wilton Daniel Gregory
- Catholic Church hierarchy
- Catholic Church in the United States
- Historical list of the Catholic bishops of the United States
- List of Catholic bishops of the United States
- Lists of patriarchs, archbishops, and bishops

Catholic Church titles
Preceded by Richard Joseph Malone	Bishop of Buffalo; 2021-present	Succeeded by Incumbent
Preceded by -	Auxiliary Bishop of Washington; 2018-2021	Succeeded by -
