= St. Joseph Cathedral (Buffalo, New York) =

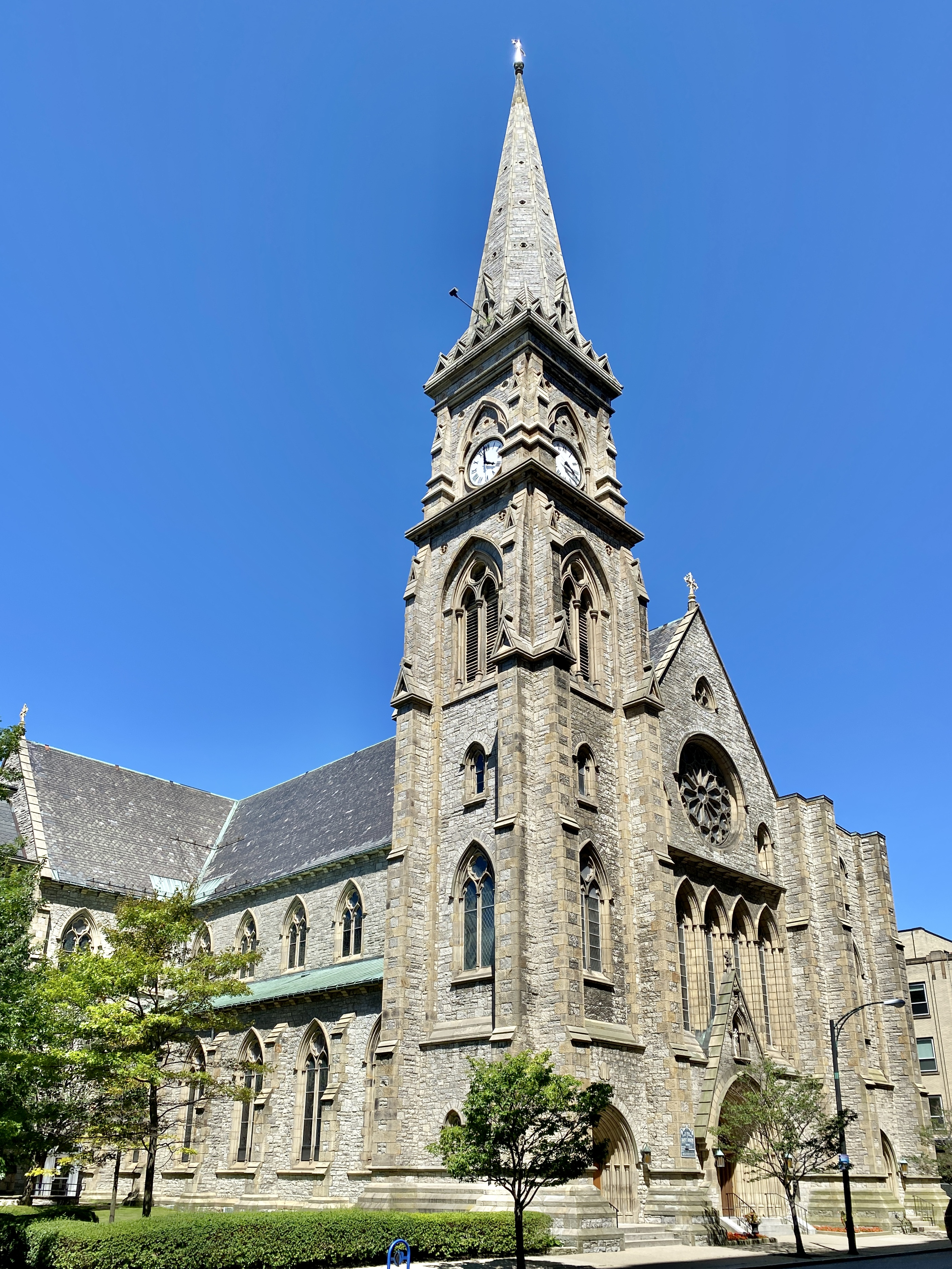
- St. Joseph Cathedral in 2022

- Location in New York
- 42°52′58″N 78°52′42″W
- Location: 50 Franklin St. Buffalo, New York
- Country: United States
- Denomination: Roman Catholic Church
- Website: www.buffalocathedral.org

History
- Dedicated: July 1, 1855
- Consecrated: August 21, 1863

Architecture
- Architect: Patrick Keely
- Style: Gothic Revival
- Groundbreaking: February 6, 1851
- Completed: 1862
- Construction cost: US$150,000 ($4.84 million in 2025 dollars)

Specifications
- Length: 120 feet (37 m)
- Width: 73 feet (22 m)
- Materials: local stone

Administration
- Diocese: Buffalo

Clergy
- Bishop: Most Rev. Michael William Fisher
- Rector: Rev. Seán Paul Fleming

Saint Joseph Cathedral is located at 50 Franklin Street in downtown Buffalo, New York within the Joseph Ellicott Historic District, and is currently the cathedral church of the Roman Catholic Diocese of Buffalo.

== History ==
Buffalo's first bishop, John Timon, established St. Joseph's in 1847 to be the seat of the new diocese. Because of the economic situation in the city he raised funds to build the church while he was in Europe. The cornerstone was laid on February 6, 1851. During construction, a storm approached the city from Lake Erie and destroyed several homes in the area. Bishop Timon allowed the residents to set up tents within the cathedral's walls for several weeks. The cathedral was usable, but not complete, when it was dedicated on July 1, 1855. The south tower was completed in the summer of 1862. Bishop Timon consecrated the completed cathedral on August 21, 1863.

In 1902, Bishop James Quigley decided that the diocese required a new cathedral and purchased property at Delaware Avenue and Utica Street beginning in 1902. Italian architect Aristide Leonori designed a new Gothic Revival cathedral which was constructed between 1912 and 1915. The new edifice became known as St. Joseph's (New) Cathedral and this church became known as St. Joseph's Old Cathedral. This time both towers of the new cathedral were completed to a height of 260 feet (79 m). However, by 1924, the north and south transepts of the new cathedral required major repairs and by 1927, the towers were so unstable they were removed. The exterior marble started to separate from the brick and Bishop Edward D. Head determined in 1976 that repairs would be too costly for the "new" St. Joseph's and the diocese. In 1977, after the demolition of the new cathedral, the "old cathedral" once again became known as St. Joseph's Cathedral.

== Architecture ==
Bishop Timon selected New York architect Patrick C. Keely, who had worked with A. W. N. Pugin, to design the church. He created a Gothic Revival structure 120 feet (37 m) in length by 73 feet (22 m) across. The original plan called for towers on the north and south corners of the facade, however only the south tower was finished. The tower contained a 43-bell carillon by Bollee & Son of Le Mans, France. At the time of its completion in 1869, the carillon was the largest in the U.S. and the third largest in the world. Installed in St. Joseph's in 1870, the bells were too large for the cathedral's tower and never worked properly. At present, all but 2 of the bells have been removed from the church tower.

Bishop Stephen V. Ryan added the Lady Chapel built at the rear of the cathedral in 1873.

The three lancet windows above the altar were produced at the direction of King Ludwig II of Bavaria for the Paris Exposition of 1855. During his trips to Europe, Bishop Timon saw the windows and asked if the King would donate them to the new structure. After first being refused, the Bishop persisted and Ludwig relented.

The cathedral was renovated in 1882, 1903–05, 1937–47 and most recently in 1977.

== Organ ==
The choir loft houses a 3,627 pipe Hook & Hastings organ, Opus 828. The organ was built in 1876 for the Philadelphia Centennial Exposition, where it was played frequently for concerts. It was moved to the Cathedral following the end of the Exposition February 13, 1877. The organ was updated in 1925 and 1976, but by 1996 had become unplayable. In 1998, the bishop and parish council engaged the Andover Organ Company to restore and expand the instrument. Andover installed the restored instrument in 2001 as its Opus R-328. It currently contains three manuals and 90 stops.

== Gallery ==
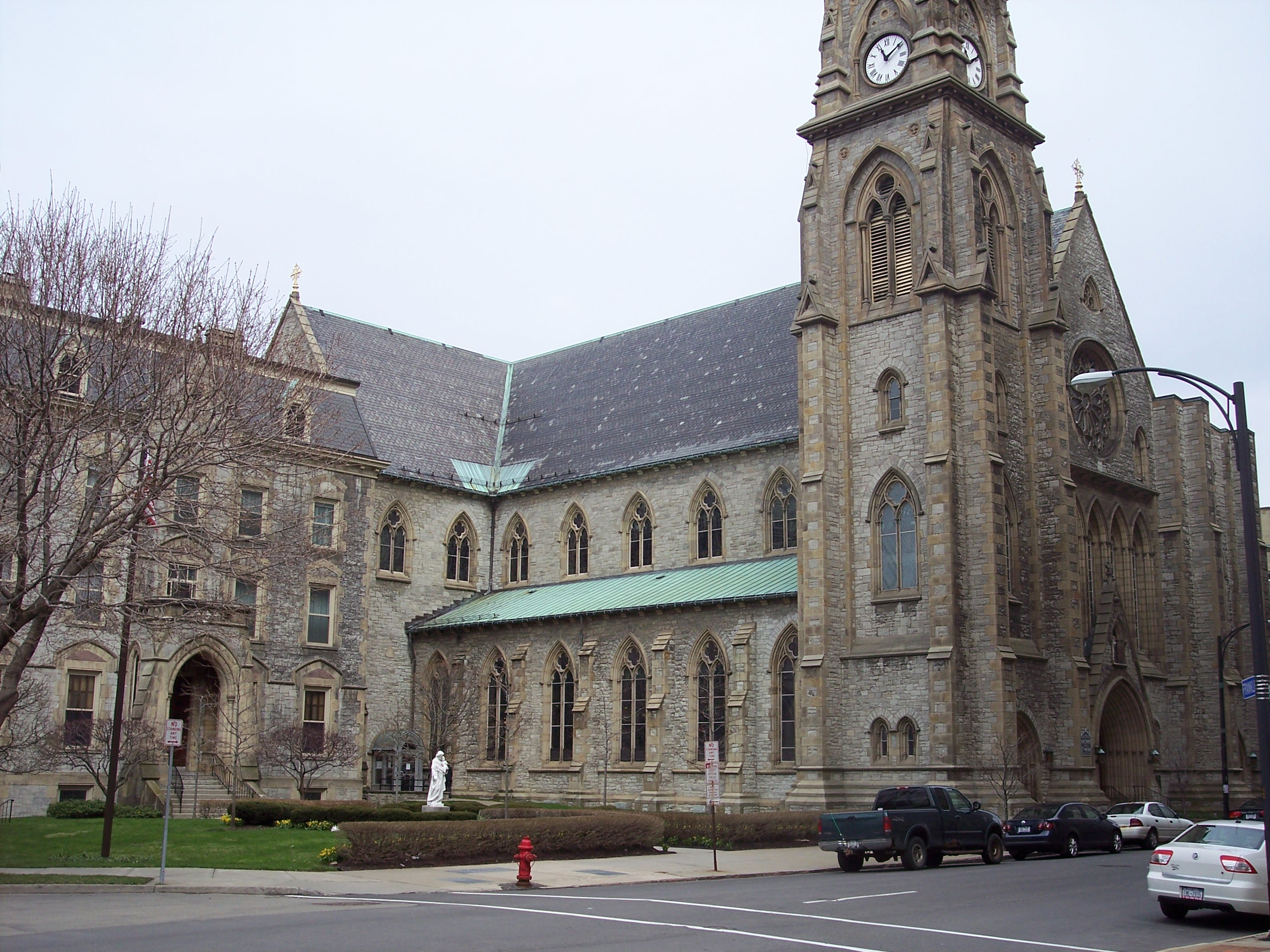
Façade detail looking northwest

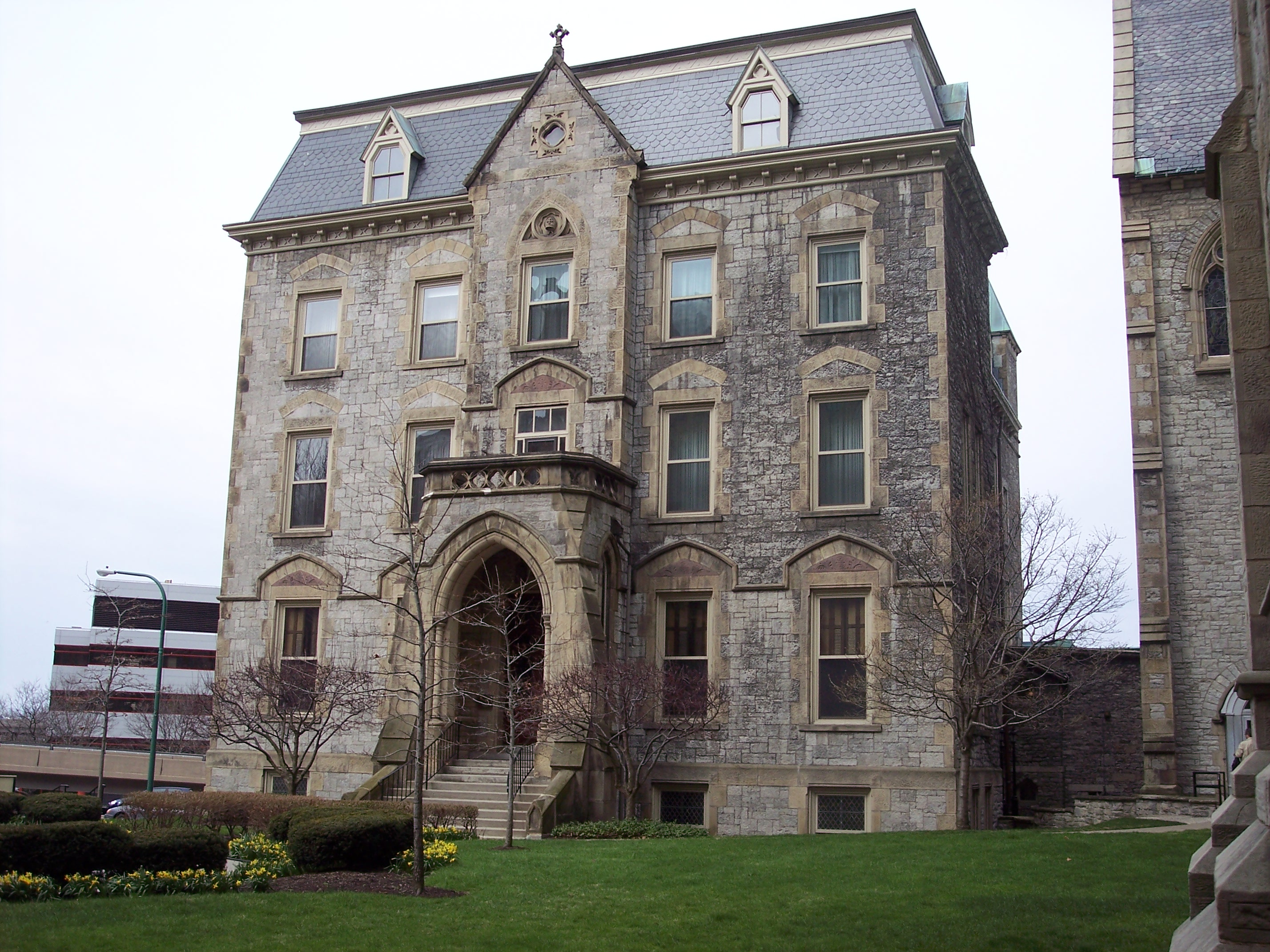
East Rectory façade

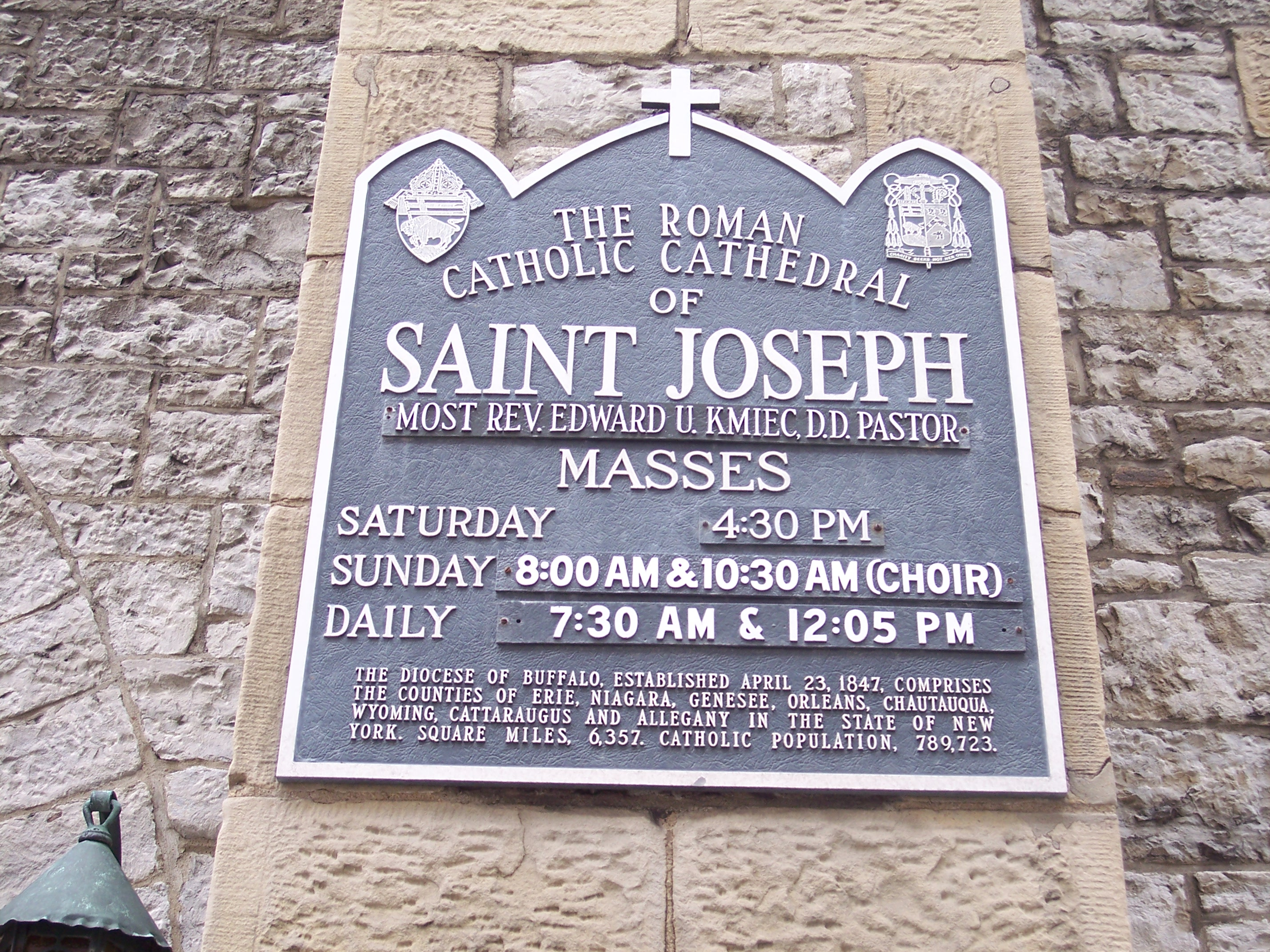
Identification plaque at the entrance

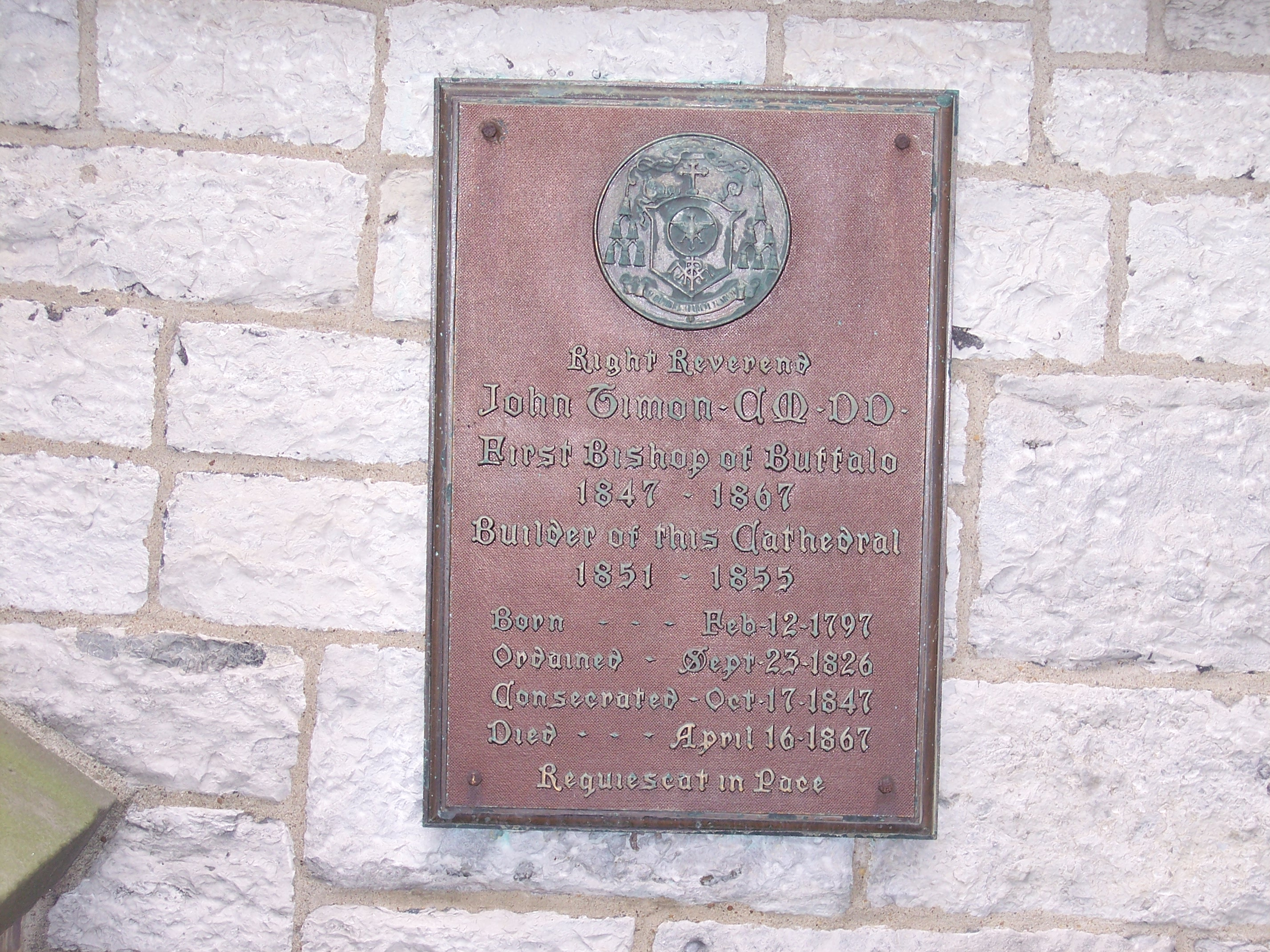
Marker commemorating Bishop John Timon at the entrance

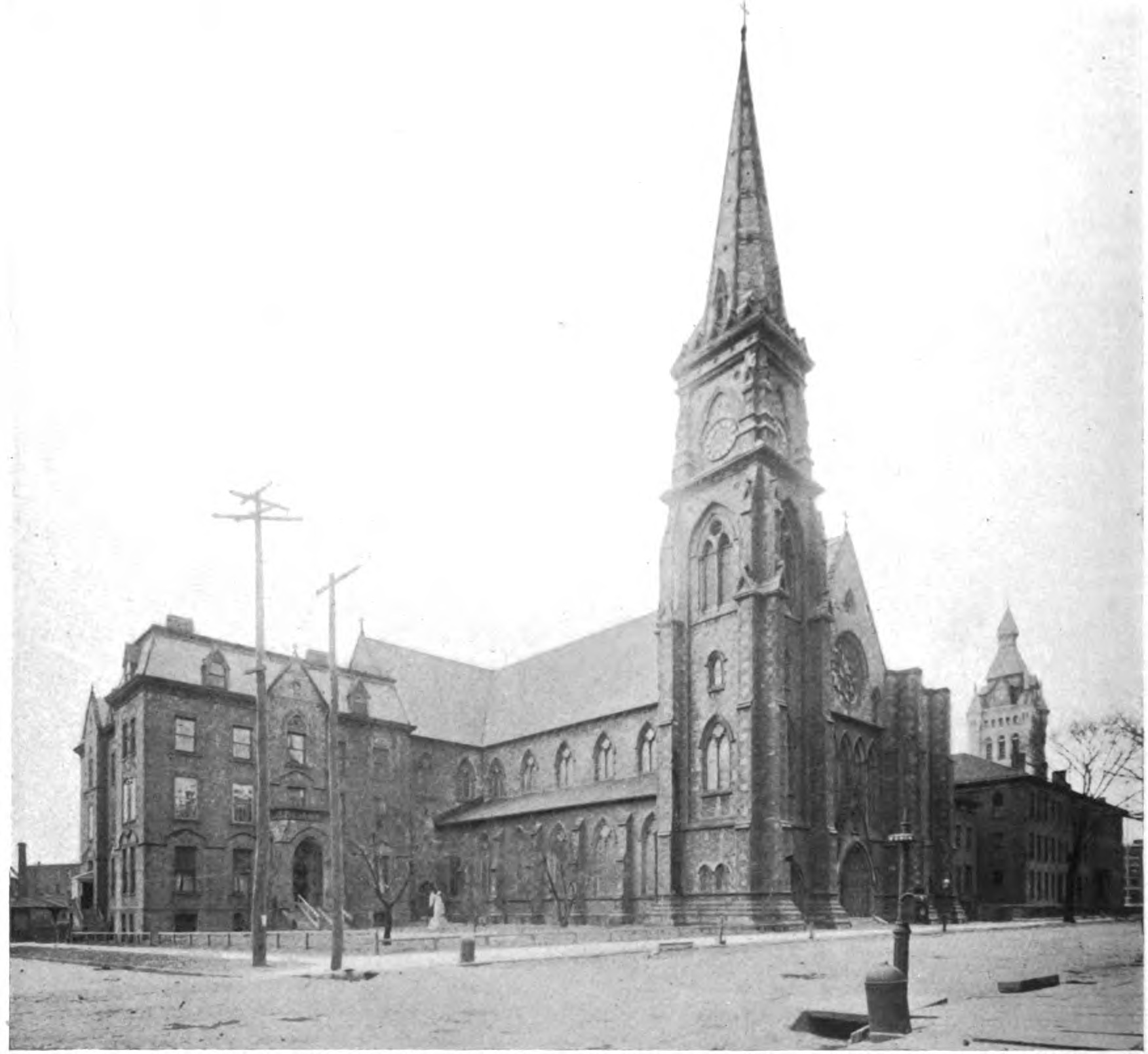
A 1914 view of the cathedral and rectory

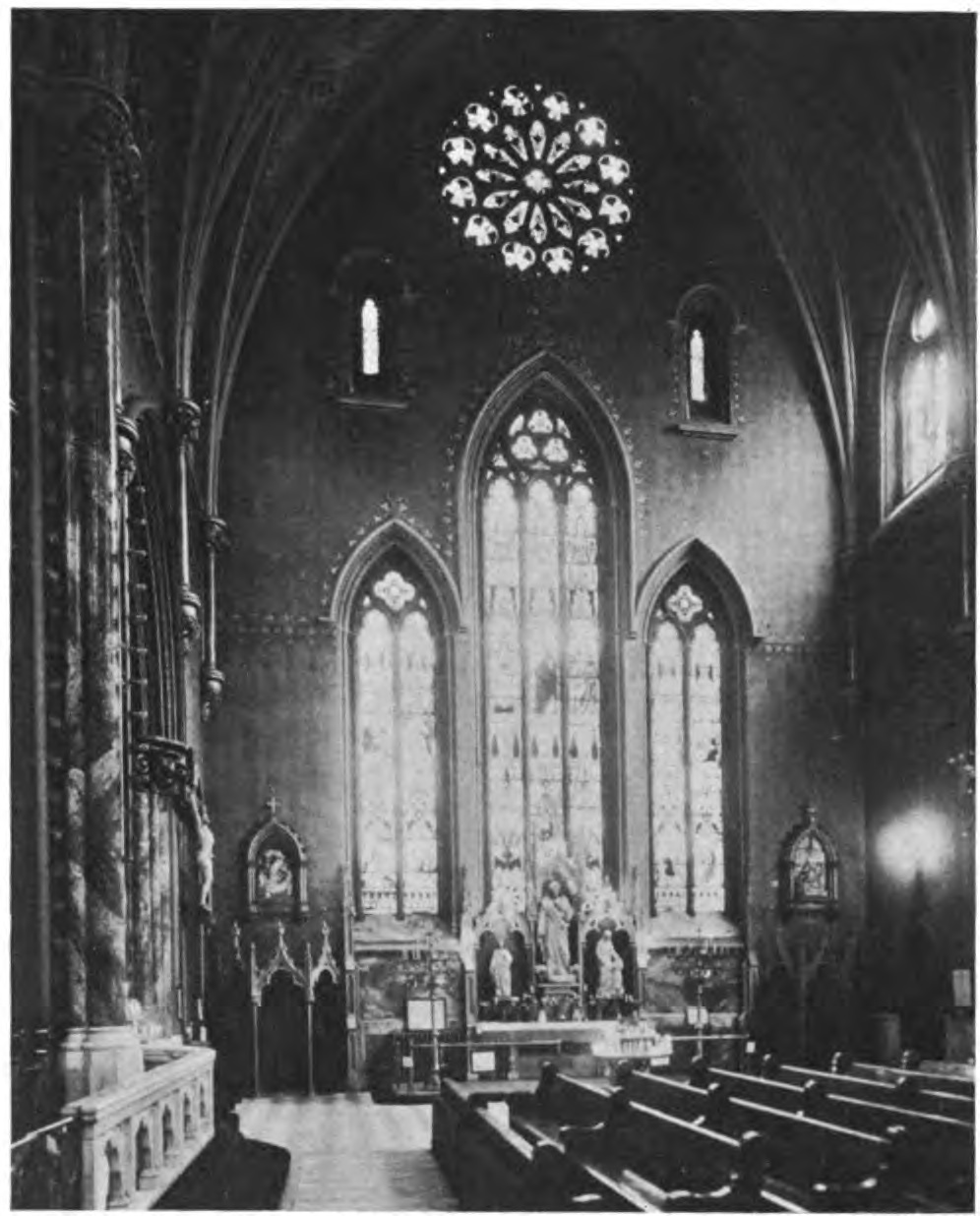
The north transept in 1914

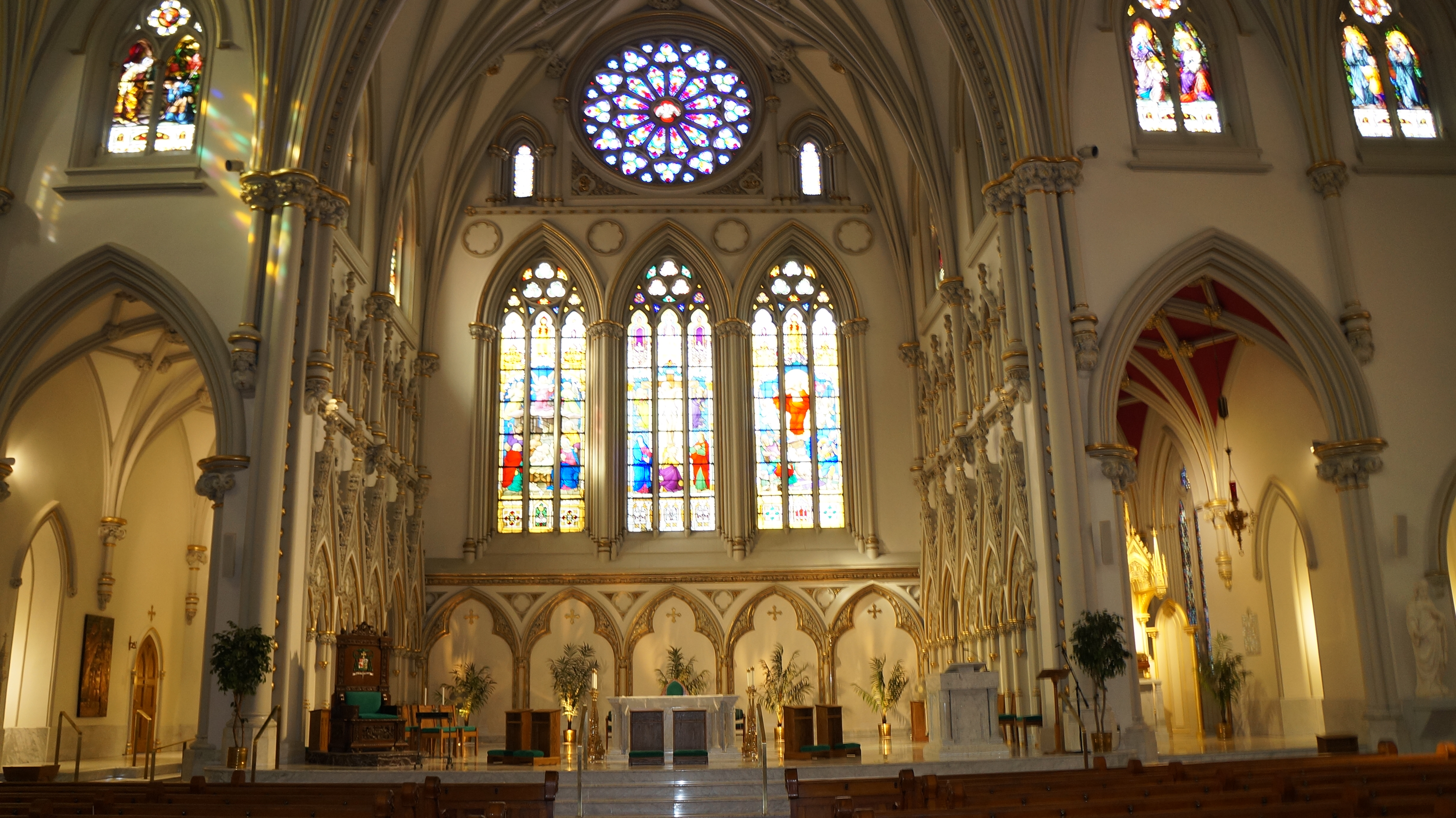
Sanctuary in 2017

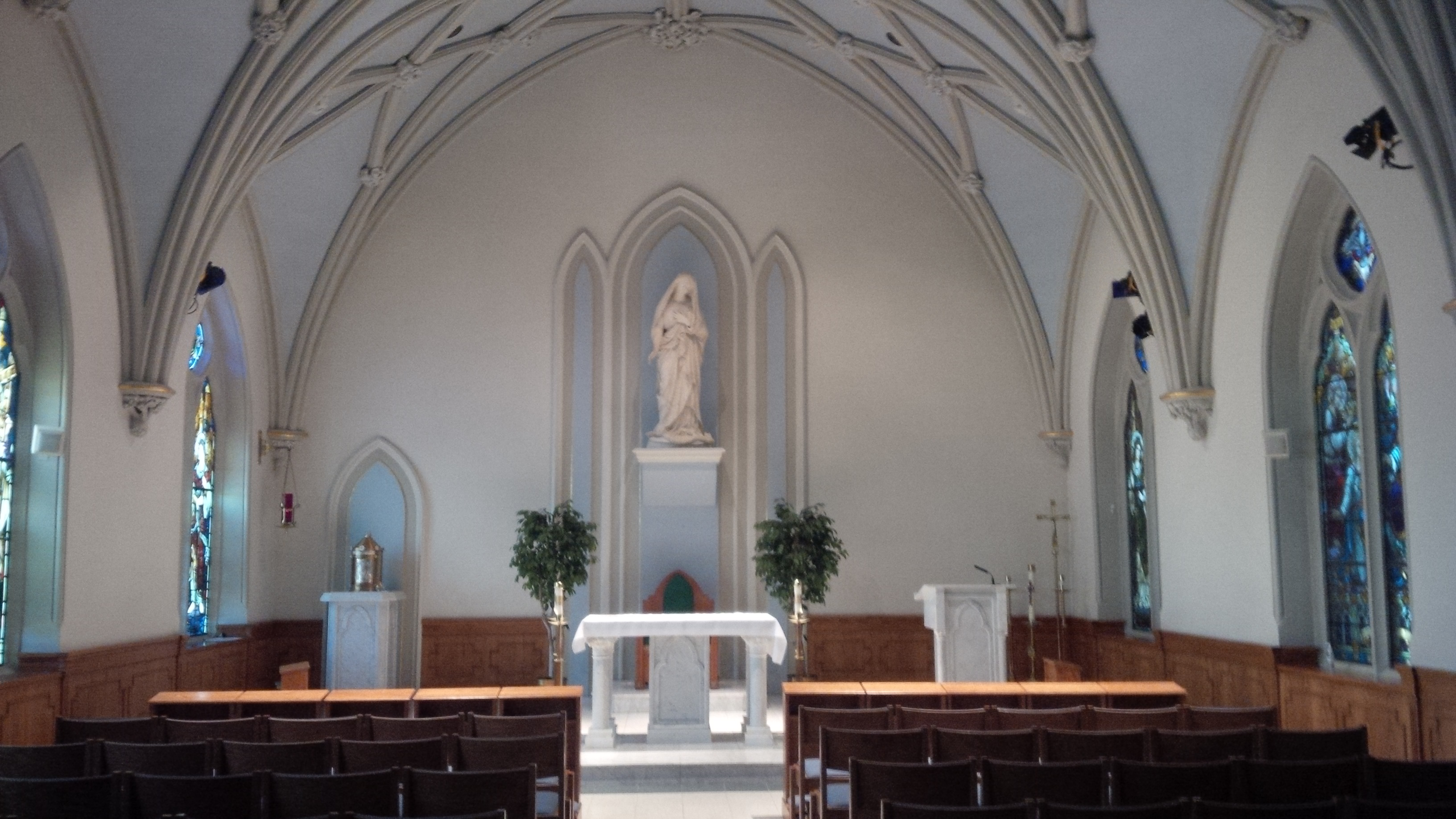
The Lady Chapel

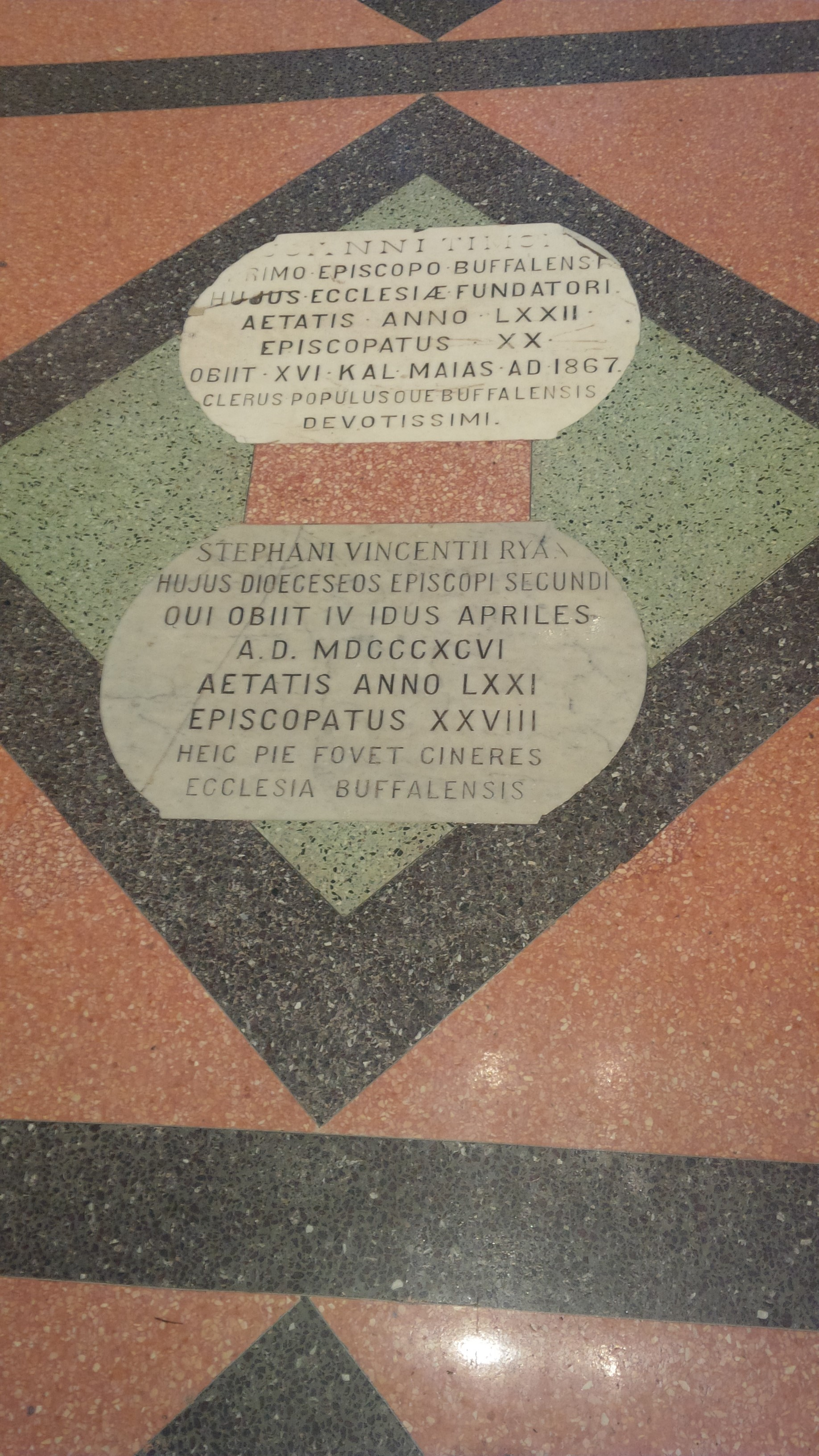
Marker denoting the burials of Bishop Timon and Bishop Ryan

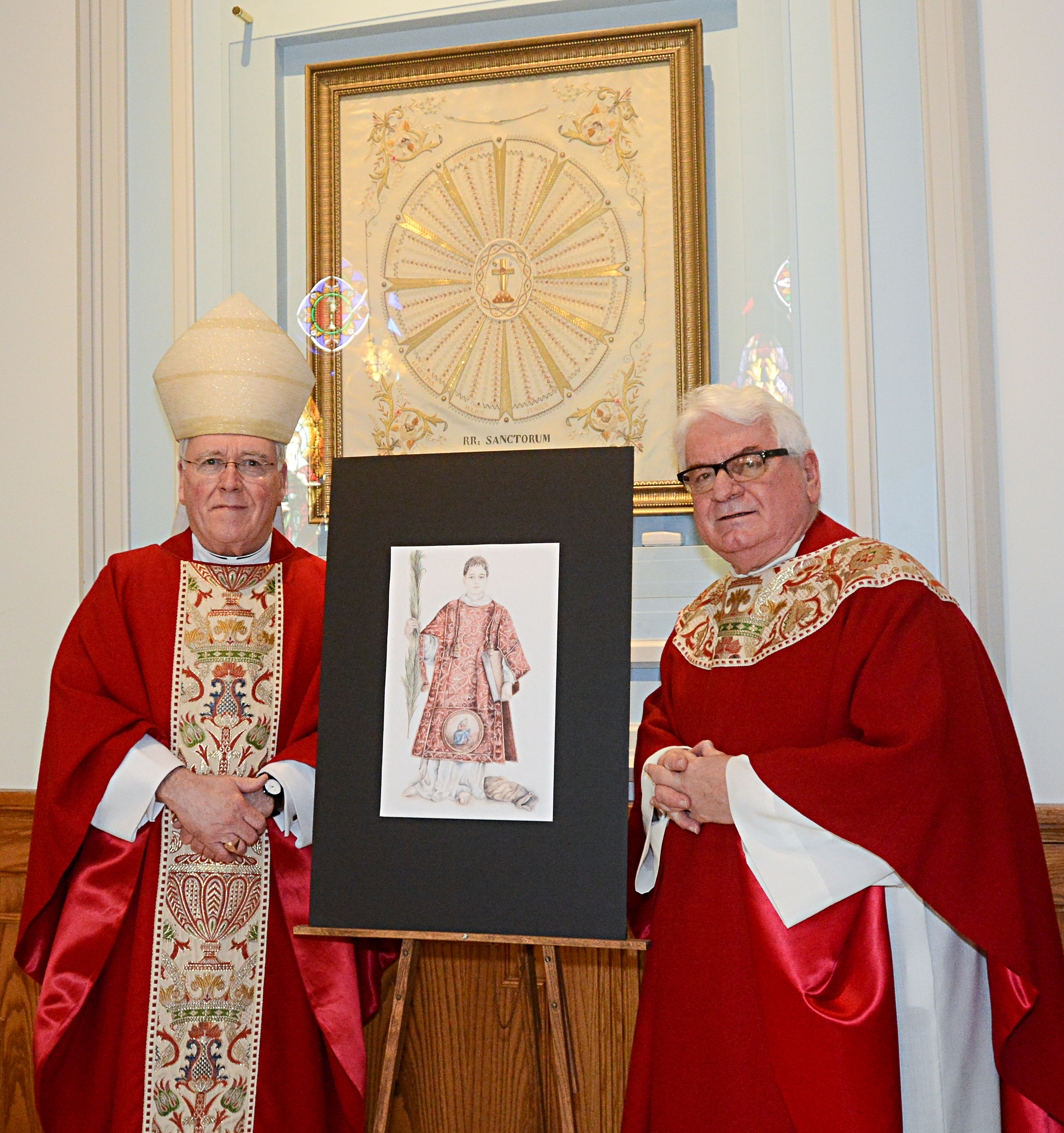
Bishop Richard J. Malone and Msgr. David S. Slubecky beneath a calendar reliquary (tapestry) of 365 saints and icon of Saint Caesarius of Terracina

== See also ==
- List of Catholic cathedrals in the United States
- List of cathedrals in the United States
