= Adnan Hyder =

Pakistani American health researcher and academic

- Born: Adnan Ali Hyder
- Education: Aga Khan University (MD); Johns Hopkins University (MPH); Johns Hopkins University (PhD)

Adnan A. Hyder is Pakistani-American academic who is the Dean of the Boston University School of Public Health since August 2025.

== Early life and education ==
Hyder was born in Pakistan. He received his MD from Aga Khan University in Pakistan in 1990. Subsequently, Hyder moved to Johns Hopkins University and earned his MPH in 1993 and his PhD in 1998, where Timothy D. Baker, a founding leader of international health, was one of his mentors, while Richard H. Morrow was his thesis advisor.

== Career ==
Under Hyder's leadership as Founding Director of the Johns Hopkins' International Injury Research Unit (JH-IIRU) in 2010, the JH-IIRU received the status designation of World Health Organization Collaborating Center for Injuries, Violence and Accident Prevention. It was only the third collaborating center in the United States to focus on injury prevention at the time. In 2012, Hyder was promoted to full professor with tenure in the Department of International Health at the Johns Hopkins Bloomberg School of Public Health. While at Johns Hopkins, Hyder was Director of the Health Systems Program and Associate Chair in the Department of International Health at Bloomberg School of Public Health; under his leadership the Health Systems program grew rapidly to work in over 55 countries around the world with tens of millions of research funding. He was also Associate Director of Global Programs at the Johns Hopkins Berman Institute of Bioethics.

Hyder has been on several technical committees, advisory panels, and review groups over the past decades; most recently he was made a commissioner of The Lancet NCDI Poverty Commission formed in January 2016.

In 2018, Hyder was recruited to join the Milken Institute School of Public Health as the Senior Associate Dean for Research and Professor of Global Health. As Senior Associate Dean for Research, Hyder oversees domestic and international engagement research strategy; compliance support systems; research communications and dissemination; policy and global affairs; and research academics at undergraduate and graduate level. Hyder leads the Office of Research Excellence with units on research integrity, compliance, and ethics; research metrics; and research administration and coordination.

In 2019, Hyder founded the Center on Commercial Determinants of Health, one of the first research centers in the world involved in studying and addressing the growing health burden caused by commercial determinants of health. The center focuses on researching private sector engagement in public health as it pertains to various vulnerable populations around the world. In August 2025, Hyder will succeed Sandro Galea as dean of the Boston University School of Public Health.

Hyder has served as a consultant to a number of organizations, including the World Health Organization and the World Bank, and is known for his work on burden of disease and injury measures, for developing the Healthy Life Years indicator, and building on the health systems approach to injury prevention and control in developing countries. Hyder was a contributing author to three chapters of the most recent Disease Control Priorities, Road Traffic Injuries, Non-Transport Unintentional Injury, and Injury Prevention and Environmental Health: Key Messages from Disease Control Priorities, Third Edition.

== Research ==
Hyder has co-authored more than 350 peer-reviewed scientific publications and numerous reports for more than 20 years on issues related to health systems development, equity, and ethics in low- and middle-income countries of Africa and Asia. Hyder's work has focused on understanding and improving the training of African and Asian health professionals in ethics.

Hyder is an outspoken advocate for road safety and has stated, "accepting our lack of progress is the first step to developing a strong and sustainable set of actions for changing the status quo on global road safety."

Hyder has worked on bioethics and research ethics globally for over 20 years with a special focus on capacity development, funded by the U.S. Fogarty International Center of the National Institutes of Health. He has also previously urged research funders to ethically design grants programs for global health research, arguing incentives should be created for applicants to focus their research on marginalized communities.

== Honors and awards ==
- 1992-1994: International Fellowship for Post-Graduate Studies in Public Health, Aga Khan Foundation, Geneva
- 1998: Elected to the Delta Omega Society - Alpha Chapter; peer reviewed honors society for public health graduates in USA. Lifetime member as of 1999
- 2000: Advising, Mentoring and Teaching Recognition Award (AMTR), Student Assembly, Johns Hopkins School of Public Health, USA
- 2001: Mid-Career Achievement Award, International Health Section, American Public Health Association, USA
- 2009: Global Health Ambassador, Research!America and Paul Rogers Society for Global Health
- 2010: Accepted the Prince Michael International Award for Road Safety for the Road Traffic Injuries Research Network (chair)
- 2011: Aron Sobel Guardian Award, Association for Safe International Road Travel
- 2019: SafeKids Worldwide, C. Everett Koop Medal of Distinction, USA
