= Patricia Coogan =

American epidemiologist

- Education: University of Cincinnati (BA); Boston University (MPH, D.Sc.)
- Scientific career
- Fields: Epidemiology

Patricia Coogan is Senior Epidemiologist at the Slone Epidemiology Center and a Boston University School of Public Health (BUSPH) Research Professor in the Department of Epidemiology. She is a co-investigator for the Black Women's Health Study (BWHS), a prospective study at the Slone Epidemiology Center.

== Biography ==
=== Education ===
- Boston University, DSc Epidemiology
- Boston University, MPH Environmental Health
- University of Cincinnati, BA Urban Studies

== Career ==
Her research interests focus on "environmental influences on health outcomes including cancer, obesity, and physical activity.

Coogan has received research grants from the National Institutes of Health including one to study air pollution and risk of incident hypertension and diabetes in African American women. It is a five year grant from the National Institute of Environmental Health Sciences. Another is a three year study funded by the National Heart, Lung, and Blood Institute to study the incidence of asthma in African American women.

== Select publications ==
- Wesselink, A. K.; Rosenberg, L.; Wise, L. A.; Jerrett, M.; Coogan, P. F. (2021). "A prospective cohort study of ambient air pollution exposure and risk of uterine leiomyomata". Human Reproduction (Oxford, England). 36 (8): 2321–2330. doi:10.1093/humrep/deab095. PMC 8487660. PMID 33984861.
- Coogan, P. F.; Rosenberg, L.; Palmer, J. R.; Cozier, Y. C.; Lenzy, Y. M.; Bertrand, K. A. (2021). "Hair product use and breast cancer incidence in the Black Women's Health Study". Carcinogenesis. 42 (7): 924–930. doi:10.1093/carcin/bgab041. PMC 8496025. PMID 34013957.
- White, A. J.; Gregoire, A. M.; Niehoff, N. M.; Bertrand, K. A.; Palmer, J. R.; Coogan, P. F.; Bethea, T. N. (2021). "Air pollution and breast cancer risk in the Black Women's Health Study". Environmental Research. 194 110651. Bibcode:2021ER....194k0651W. doi:10.1016/j.envres.2020.110651. PMC 7946730. PMID 33387538.
- Coogan, Patricia F.; Coogan, Matthew A. (August 25, 2016). "When Worlds Collide: Observations on the Integration of Epidemiology and Transportation Behavioral Analysis in the Study of Walking". American Journal of Health Promotion. 19 (1): 39–44. doi:10.4278/0890-1171-19.1.39. PMID 15460100. S2CID 3322398.
- "Depressive symptoms linked to adult-onset asthma in African-American women". ScienceDaily. January 21, 2014.
