= José E. Serrano =

American politician (born 1943)

José Serrano
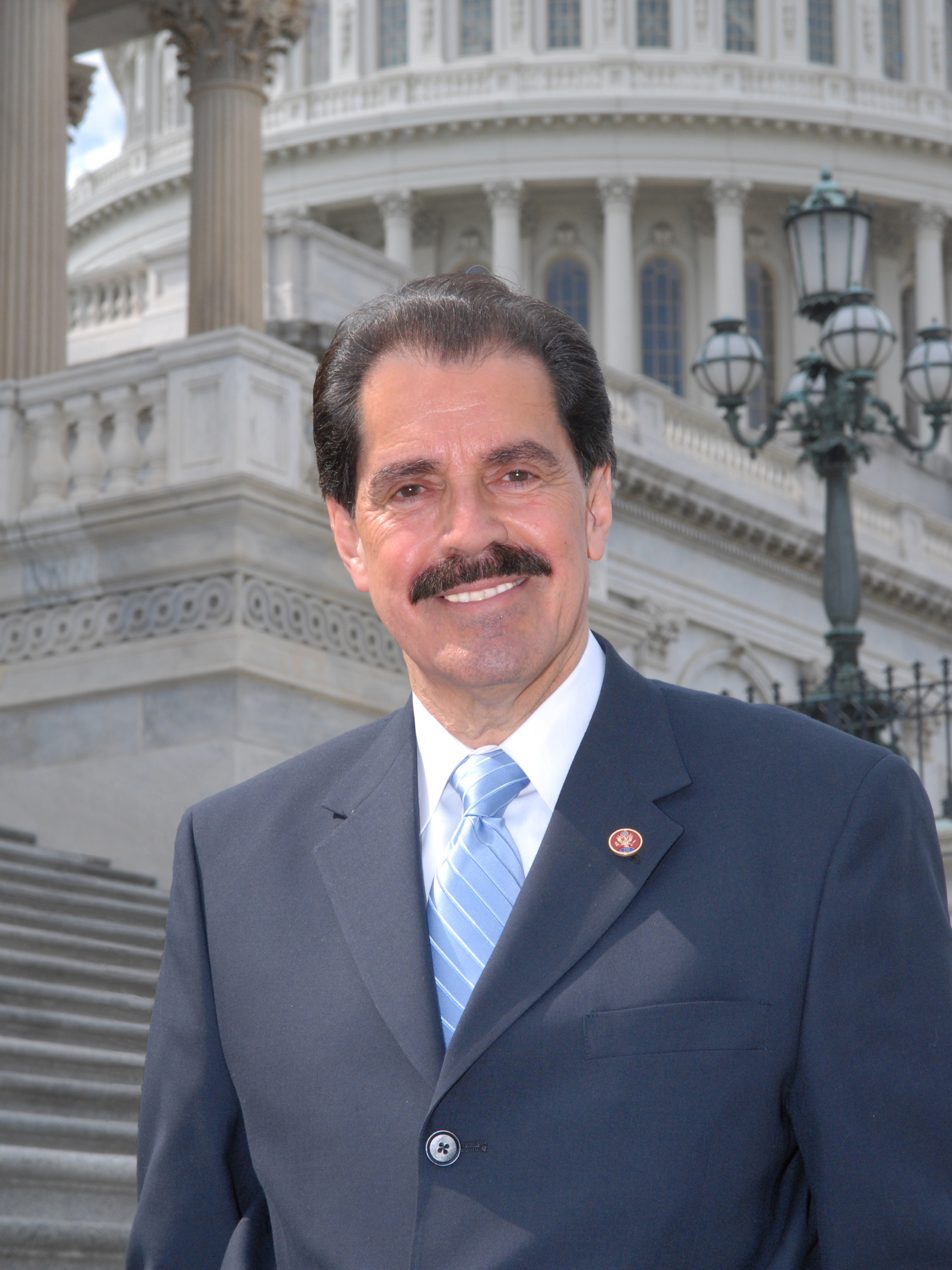

Member of the U.S. House of Representatives from New York
- In office March 20, 1990 – January 3, 2021 (Note: Serrano's official service begins on the date of the special election, while he was not sworn in until March 28, 1990.)
- Preceded by: Robert Garcia
- Succeeded by: Ritchie Torres
- Constituency: 18th district (1990–1993); 16th district (1993–2013); 15th district (2013–2021)

Member of the New York State Assembly
- In office January 1, 1975 – March 21, 1990
- Preceded by: Eugenio Alvarez
- Succeeded by: David Rosado
- Constituency: 75th district (1975–1982); 73rd district (1983–1990)

Personal details
- Born: José Enrique Serrano; October 24, 1943 (age 83) Mayagüez, Puerto Rico
- Party: Democratic
- Children: 5, including José
- Education: Lehman College (attended)

Military service
- Allegiance: United States
- Branch/service: United States Army
- Years of service: 1964–1966
- Unit: 172nd Support Battalion
- Serrano's voice Serrano paying tribute to the New York Yankees winning their 27th World Series championship. Recorded November 6, 2009

José Enrique Serrano (born October 24, 1943) is an American politician who was a member of the U.S. House of Representatives from 1990 until his retirement in 2021. Serrano, a Democrat from New York, represented a district that is one of the smallest in the country geographically, consisting of a few square miles of the heavily populated South Bronx in New York City. His district was also one of the most densely populated and one of the few majority Hispanic districts in the country. The district was numbered the 18th from 1990 to 1993 and the 16th from 1993 to 2013, and the 15th district from 2013 to 2021. He was the longest-serving Hispanic-American in the House. He did not run for re-election in 2020 due to a diagnosis of Parkinson's disease, and Ritchie Torres was elected to succeed him.

== Early life, education, and military service ==
Serrano was born in Mayagüez, Puerto Rico. At the age of seven, he moved with his family to The Bronx, where he was raised in the Mill Brook Houses in Mott Haven, Bronx. He attended Grace Dodge Vocational High School in the Bronx and briefly studied at Lehman College in 1961.

From 1964 to 1966, Serrano served as a private in the 172nd Support Battalion of the United States Army Medical Corps. He worked for Manufacturers Hanover Bank from 1961 to 1969, except during his military service. He later served on New York City's District 7 School Board from 1969 to 1974. Serrano was also chairman of the South Bronx Community Corporation and a delegate to the 1976 Democratic National Convention.

== New York Assembly ==
Serrano was a member of the New York State Assembly from 1975 to 1990, sitting in the 181st, 182nd, 183rd, 184th, 185th, 186th, 187th and 188th New York State Legislatures. His district was numbered the 75th until 1982, and the 73rd from 1983 on. He was Chairman of the Committee on Consumer Affairs (1979-1983), and the Committee on Education (1983-1990).

== U.S. House of Representatives ==
=== Elections ===
In 1990, Serrano won a special election for the seat vacated by resigning U.S. Congressman Robert García with 92% of the vote. He never won re-election with less than 92% of the vote in what is considered one of the safest seats in Congress.

In 2004, Serrano faced an electoral challenge from Jose Serrano, an unemployed former loading dockworker with the same name who eventually dropped out of the race in July.

=== Tenure ===
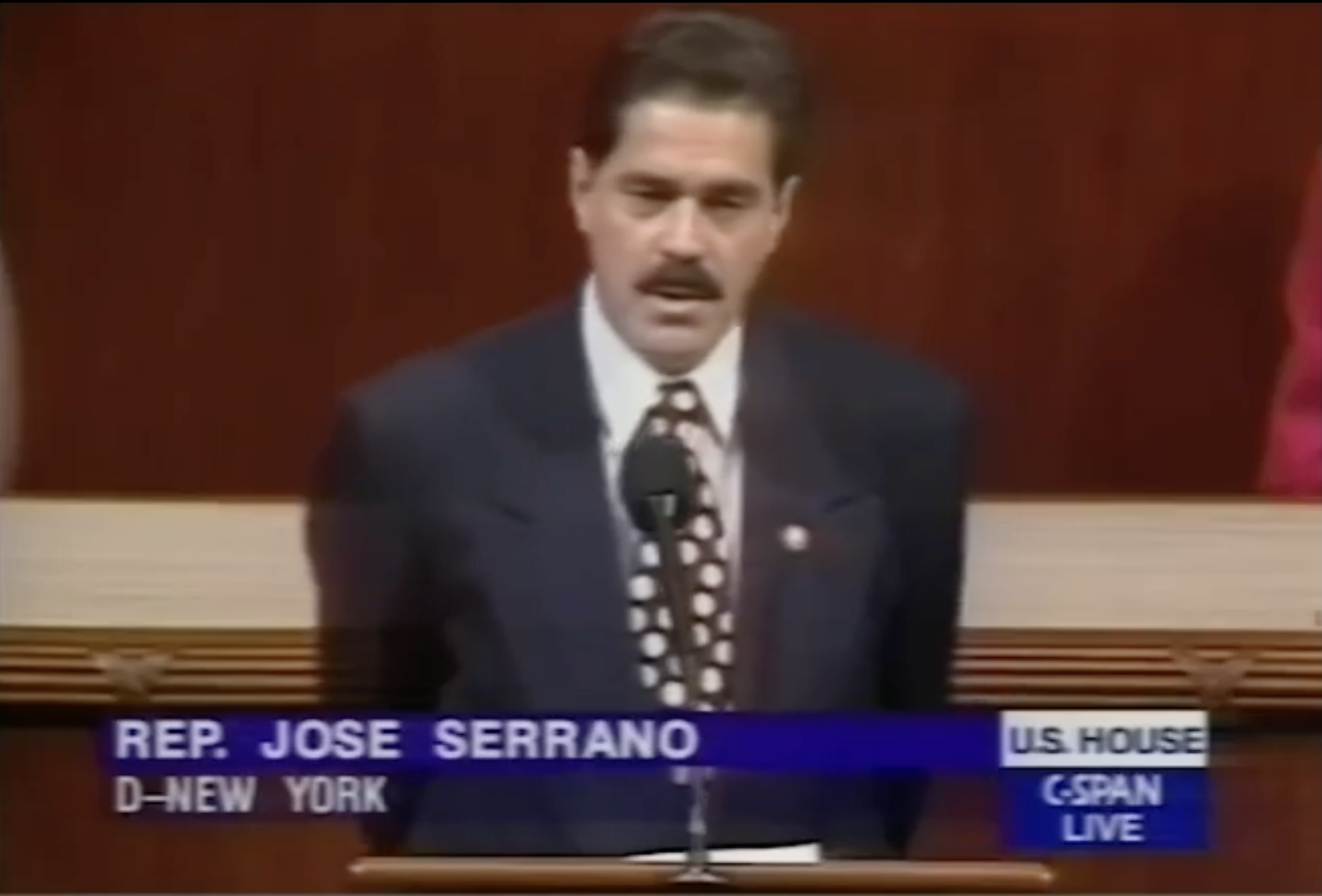
Serrano speaks during floor debate on December 19, 1998, that preceded that vote on the impeachment of President Bill Clinton

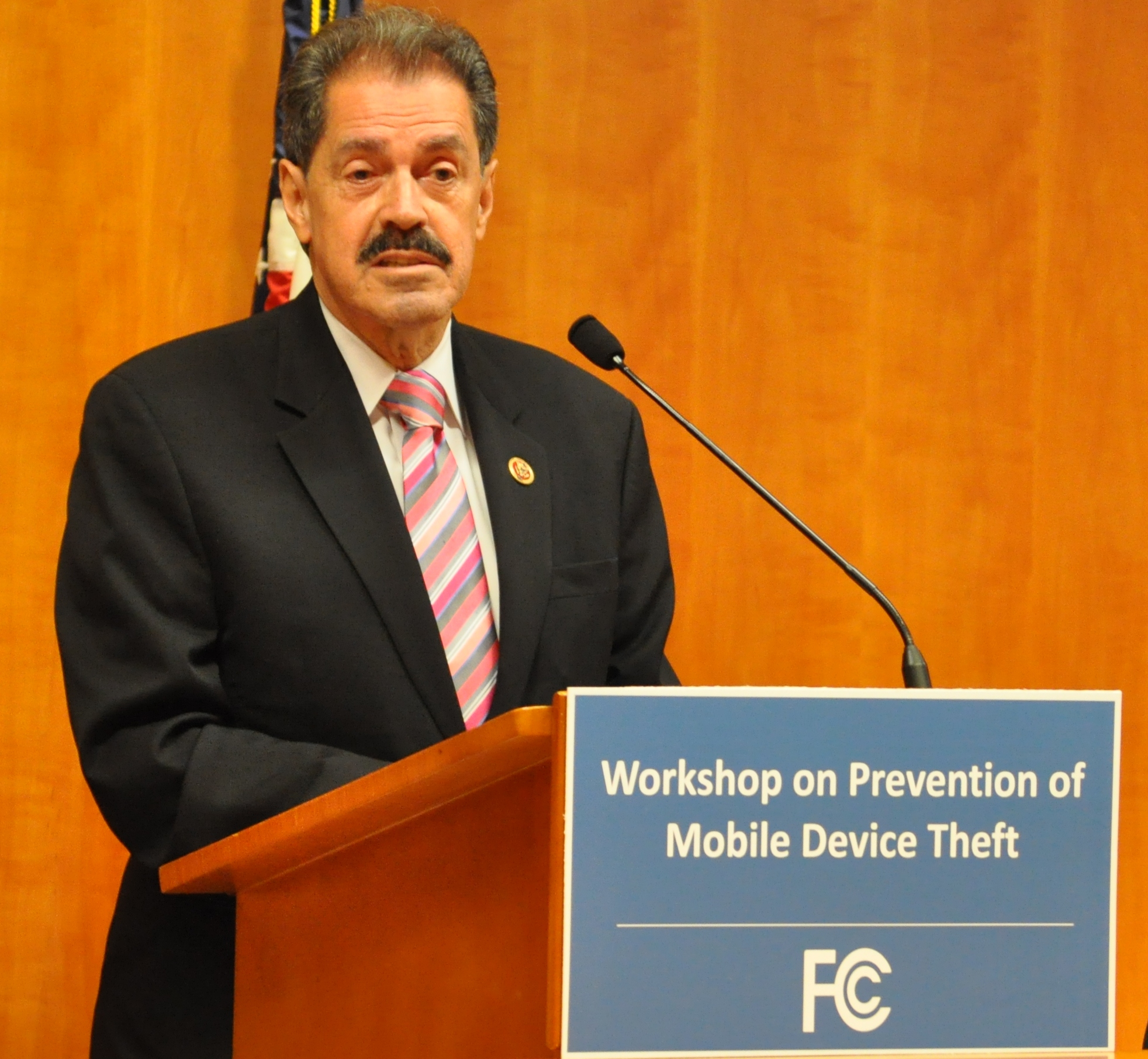
Serrano at an event in 2014

A member of the Progressive Caucus, Serrano was widely regarded as one of the most progressive members of Congress. He was questioned about his pork barrel spending by some fiscally conservative members of Congress. Arizona Congressman Jeff Flake once said of Serrano's $150,000 earmark to repair the roof at the city-owned Arthur Avenue Market (a historic indoor produce and prepared food market in the Bronx's "Little Italy"), "I would argue this is one cannoli the taxpayer doesn't want to take a bite of." Serrano replied to Flake, "The more you get up on these, sir, the more I realize that you do not know what you are talking about. I make no excuses about the fact that I earmark dollars to go in the poorest congressional district in the nation, which is situated in the richest city on earth."

On November 18, 2005, Serrano was one of three members of the House of Representatives to vote in favor of immediate withdrawal of American troops from Iraq. The other two votes were from Cynthia McKinney of Georgia and Robert Wexler of Florida.

In 1997 [HJR 19], 1999 [HJR 17], 2001 [HJR 4], 2003 [HJR 11], 2005 [HJR 9], 2007 [HJR 8], 2009 [HJR 5], 2011 [HJR 17], and 2013 [HJR 15], Serrano introduced a joint resolution proposing an amendment to the Constitution of the United States to repeal the 22nd Amendment, thereby removing presidential term limits. Each resolution died without ever getting past the committee.

Serrano paid attention to local environmental issues in New York, with a particular focus on constructing greenways, acquiring parklands, and cleaning up the Bronx River, which ran through his district. In 2007, a beaver was discovered swimming in the river for the first time in 200 years, something seen as a testament to his efforts. The biologists who made the discovery named the animal José, after Serrano. Also that year, he engineered the purchase of the last privately owned island in New York harbor—South Brother Island—for preservation in perpetuity by the City of New York as a wildlife refuge for rare shorebirds.

Serrano was one of three New York-area congressmen on the House Appropriations Committee, the others being Nita Lowey of the 18th district and Grace Meng of the 6th district. At the end of his tenure, he was the ranking member of the Appropriations Subcommittee on Financial Services, having previously served as the chair. As chairman, he successfully engineered the inclusion of language in the 2007 omnibus spending bill that guaranteed the extension of the 50 State Quarters program to include the minting of six additional quarters to honor the District of Columbia and the five United States territories, including Serrano's native Puerto Rico.

Serrano advocated for Puerto Ricans under FBI prosecution. In May 2000, he brokered an agreement with then-FBI Director Louis Freeh, then-Puerto Rican Independence Party Electoral Commissioner Manuel Rodríguez Orellana and then-Puerto Rico Senate Federal Affairs Committee chairman (and future Puerto Rico Senate President and Secretary of State) Kenneth McClintock that resulted in the release of nearly 100,000 pages of previously secret FBI files on Puerto Rican political activists.

Serrano was a critic of the Bush administration's approach to handling President Hugo Chávez of Venezuela. In 2005, while the Venezuelan President was in New York City speaking before the United Nations, the congressman invited him to his district to speak to his constituency. After Chávez' death, Serrano published condolences via Twitter, describing him as a leader who "understood the needs of the poor" and was "committed to empowering the powerless". Serrano's tweet prompted a response from the Republican National Committee, which asserted that it was "simply insulting that a Democrat Congressman would praise the authoritarian ruler Hugo Chávez".

Serrano criticized Brazil's president Jair Bolsonaro. In March 2019, he and 29 other Democratic lawmakers wrote a letter to Secretary of State Mike Pompeo that read in part: "Since the election of far-right candidate Jair Bolsonaro as president, we have been particularly alarmed by the threat Bolsonaro's agenda poses to the LGBTQ+ community and other minority communities, women, labor activists, and political dissidents in Brazil."

In March 2019, Serrano announced that he would not seek re-election in 2020 because he had been diagnosed with Parkinson's disease.

=== Committee assignments ===
- Committee on Appropriations
  - Subcommittee on Commerce, Justice, Science, and Related Agencies
  - Subcommittee on Financial Services and General Government (Ranking Member)
  - Subcommittee on Interior, Environment, and Related Agencies

=== Caucus memberships ===
- Congressional Hispanic Caucus
- Congressional Progressive Caucus.
- Congressional Caucus on Global Road Safety
- International Conservation Caucus
- Congressional Arts Caucus
- Afterschool Caucuses
- United States Congressional International Conservation Caucus

=== Party leadership ===
- Senior Whip

== Personal life ==
Serrano's son, José M. Serrano, is a member of the New York State Senate. In addition to José Jr, Serrano has four other children.

In March 2019, Serrano announced that he had been diagnosed with Parkinson's disease and would not seek re-election in 2020.

== See also ==
- List of Hispanic and Latino Americans in the United States Congress
- List of Puerto Ricans
- Nuyorican
- Puerto Ricans in New York City
- Puerto Rico Democracy Act of 2007

U.S. House of Representatives
Preceded by Robert García	Member of the U.S. House of Representatives from New York's 18th congressional district 1990–1993	Succeeded by Nita Lowey
Preceded by Charles Rangel	Member of the U.S. House of Representatives from New York's 16th congressional district 1993–2013	Succeeded by Eliot Engel
Preceded by Solomon P. Ortiz	Chair of the Congressional Hispanic Caucus; 1993–1995	Succeeded by Ed Pastor
Preceded by Charles Rangel	Member of the U.S. House of Representatives from New York's 15th congressional district 2013–2021	Succeeded by Ritchie Torres
U.S. order of precedence (ceremonial)
Preceded by Gary Ackerman as Former U.S. Representative	Order of precedence of the United States as Former U.S. Representative	Succeeded by Carolyn Maloney as Former U.S. Representative
