= Deborah J. Cotton =

American physician

Deborah J. Cotton is the Associate Director for Research, Section of Infectious Diseases at the Boston Medical Center and Emerita Professor of Medicine at the Boston University School of Medicine (BUSM). She’s also been a professor of Epidemiology at the Boston University School of Public Health.

== Education ==
A 1976 graduate of the BUSM, Cotton completed infectious disease fellowships at the National Cancer Institute in 1984 and National Institute of Health in 1985. Cotton also earned a MPH from the Johns Hopkins Bloomberg School of Public Health (1986) and a degree in Biology from Brandeis University.

== Career ==
When Cotton was recruited by Boston University to serve as the first Assistant Provost for Clinical Research and Director of the Office of Clinical Research in 1998, she was recruited from Massachusetts General Hospital and Harvard Medical School. Her other positions include Chief, Medical Service, VA Boston Healthcare System and Vice-Chair for Veteran’s Affairs, BUSM Department of Medicine (2000-2004), Chief Medical Officer of the Clinton Foundation HIV/AIDS Initiative (CHAI) from 2007 until 2009 and since 2009, Deputy Editor of the Annals of Internal Medicine.
