= Stephanie Factor =

Infectious Disease Specialist

Dr. Stephanie Factor
- Education: Brown University Johns Hopkins School of Medicine Johns Hopkins Bloomberg School of Public Health
- Occupation(s): Internist, epidemiologist
- Medical career
- Profession: physician
- Field: infectious disease
- Institutions: Icahn School of Medicine at Mount Sinai

Stephanie Factor is an internist who specializes in infectious diseases and an epidemiologic researcher at the Icahn School of Medicine at Mount Sinai and was an Epidemic Intelligence Service officer in the Respiratory Diseases Branch of CDC when she led the field investigations in the Central Asian Republics; medical epidemiologist in the CDC Bioterrorism Preparedness Response Program assigned to the New York City Department of Health and Mental Hygiene to develop emergency response plans for New York City.

Factor is also an associate professor of Medicine, Infectious Diseases and assistant professor of Obstetrics, Gynecology and Reproductive Science. She earned both an MPH and MD at Johns Hopkins University.

== Selected publications ==
- Factor SH, LaClaire L, Bronsdon M, Suleymanova F, Altynbaeva G, Kadirov BA, et al. Streptococcus pneumoniae and Haemophilus influenzae type b vaccination, central Asia. Emerg Infect Dis [serial on the Internet]. 2005 Sep [date cited]. http://dx.doi.org/10.3201/eid1109.040798
- Factor SH, Galea S, de Duenas Geli LG, Saynisch M, Blumenthal S, Canales E, Poulson M, Foley M, Vlahov D. Development of a "survival" guide for substance users in Harlem, New York City. Health Educ Behav. 2002 Jun;29(3):312-25. doi: 10.1177/109019810202900304. PMID 12038741.
- Fierer, Daniel, Stephanie Factor Sexual Transmission of Hepatitis C Virus Among HIV-Infected Men Who Have Sex With Men-New York City, 2005-2010 (Reprinted from MMWR, vol 60, pg 945-950, 2011)September 2011JAMA The Journal of the American Medical Association 306(11):1194-1196

== Research projects ==
- Hepatitis C Virus Infection in WTC Responders
