= BWHS =

BWHS may refer to:

- Big Walnut High School, a high school in Sunbury, Ohio
- Bishop Watterson High School, a high school in Columbus, Ohio
- Black Women's Health Study
- Briar Woods High School, a high school in Ashburn, Virginia
- Bellevue West High School, a high school in Bellevue Nebraska
