= Michael Stein =

American physician, health policy researcher, and author

Michael D. Stein
- Born: January 15, 1960 (age 66); New Jersey, U.S.
- Education: Harvard College; Columbia College of Physicians and Surgeons
- Spouse: Hester Kaplan
- Scientific career
- Fields: Substance use disorders Public health Mental health HIV/AIDS
- Workplaces: Boston University School of Public Health
- Website: www.michaelsteinbooks.com

Michael D. Stein (born January 15, 1960) is an American physician, health policy researcher, and author. He currently serves as the Chair and Professor of Health Law, Policy & Management at the Boston University School of Public Health. For the past three decades, Dr. Stein has produced work that has spanned the topics of sleep and pain, addiction and HIV/AIDS, mental health and behavioral risk-taking, health care access and quality.

== Career ==
Stein's research expertise spans behavioral medicine, primary care, substance use disorders, HIV/AIDS, mental health, and the determinants of risk-taking behavior. Before joining Boston University, Stein spent 28 years at Brown University as a general internist and Professor of medicine. He directed HIV services at Rhode Island Hospital for two decades and then led behavioral medicine at Butler Hospital. He has published more than 450 peer-reviewed scientific articles.

Stein has authored numerous books, both fiction and non-fiction. His fiction has twice been nominated for the Pulitzer Prize. His first nonfiction book "The Lonely Patient," won the Christopher Award. His recent books about public health topics have included "The Turning Point: Reflections on a Pandemic" (2024), co-authored with Sandro Galea. Stein is also the executive editor of Public Health Post, Boston University's acclaimed population health online magazine.

In 2024, Stein was appointed interim dean of the SPH beginning in 2025.
