= Congressional Caucus on Global Road Safety =

US congressional caucus

Congressional Caucus on Global Road Safety is a congressional caucus that aims to increase awareness of road safety issues within the House of Representatives. The caucus holds educational briefings to increase knowledge of the pressing matters of road safety, including the effects of international road safety on American travelers. It also works to pass related legislation through Congress.

== Legislation ==
Caucus members in the 111th Congress co-sponsored the successful H Con Res 74, a resolution supporting the goals and ideas of a decade of action for road safety with a global target to reduce by 50 percent the predicted increase in global road deaths between 2010 and 2020.

Caucus members in the 110th Congress co-sponsored the successful H Con Res 87, a resolution supporting the goals and ideals of a world day of remembrance for road crash victims.

== History ==
The Global Road Safety Caucus was founded in 2004 by Representative Robert Wexler (D-FL) with the help of the Association for Safe International Road Travel (ASIRT). Wexler was a co-chair until his resignation from the House of Representatives in 2010.

== Membership ==
The Caucus was co-chaired by:

- Rep. Chris Van Hollen (D‑MD‑8)
- Rep. Dan Burton (R‑IN‑5)
- Rep. Alcee Hastings (D‑FL‑20)

Members included:

- Rep. Michael Capuano (D‑MA)
- Rep. Joseph Crowley (D‑NY)
- Rep. Eliot Engel (D‑NY)
- Rep. Sheila Jackson-Lee (D‑TX)
- Rep. Eddie Bernice Johnson (D‑TX)
- Rep. Hank Johnson (D‑GA‑4)
- Rep. Steve LaTourette (R‑OH)
- Rep. Barbara Lee (D‑CA‑12)
- Rep. John Lewis (D‑GA‑5)
- Rep. Nita Lowey (D‑NY‑17)
- Rep. Betty McCollum (D‑MN‑4)
- Rep. James Oberstar (D‑MN‑8)
- Rep. John Olver (D‑MA‑1)
- Rep. Frank Pallone (D‑NJ‑6)
- Rep. Donald Payne (D‑NJ‑10)
- Rep. Jose Serrano (D‑NY)
- Rep. Edolphus Towns (D-NY)
- Rep. Henry Waxman (D‑CA‑33)
