= President's commission on aviation security and terrorism =

History
- Established by: George H. W. Bush on 4 August 1989
- Disbanded: 27 September 1991
- Related Executive Order number(s): 12686, 12705, 12774

Membership
- Chairperson: Ann McLaughlin Korologos
- Other committee members: Hon. Edward Hidalgo Gen. Thomas C. Richards, USAF (Ret.); Sen. Alfonse D'Amato; Rep. John Paul Hammerschmidt Sen. Frank Lautenberg

Jurisdiction
- Purpose: Review U.S. aviation policies and practices regarding terrorist threats, how U.S. aviation customers are informed of these threats, and the U.S. laws, policies, and practices that deal with the families of terrorists' victims.

Pan American Flight 103 blew up over Lockerbie, Scotland, on December 21, 1988. 243 passengers, 16 crew members, and 11 people on the ground were killed by the explosion. It was the second most disastrous passenger airline explosion up to that time. By the next day, experts found enough evidence to declare the explosion to have been caused by sabotage. Within days intelligence sources reported an anonymous telephone call to the United States embassy in Helsinki, Finland, on December 5, 1988, warned of possible sabotage on the flight.

Newly elected President George H. W. Bush met with victims' families in April 1989. Relatives present asked for an independent investigation of airline security which, they claimed, should have prevented the disaster. Bush promised he would look into establishing just such a commission. Relatives also complained about the State Department's poor consular services for assisting victims' family members. This news seemed to shock the President.

U.S. government personnel were belatedly reported to be deeply involved in the investigation. The Federal Bureau of Investigation (FBI) was working closely with its European counterparts The Department of Justice was conducting a criminal investigation, and the Federal Aviation Administration (FAA) was investigating its internal securities procedures.

U.S. Congressional response to the disaster came when Senator Frank R. Lautenberg (D-NJ) introduced Senate Resolution S. Res. 86, calling on the President to appoint a special commission "to investigate the events surrounding the destruction of Pan Am 103" That same day, President Bush did so.

== Official name ==
- "President's Commission on Aviation Security and Terrorism"

== Enabling authorities ==
- President George H.W. Bush established the commission with Executive Order 12686 on August 4, 1989.
- President Bush extended the deadline for the commission to issue its final report by May 15, 1990, with Executive Order 12705 on March 3, 1990.

== Termination ==
- The commission presented its report to President Bush on May 15, 1990. In accordance with Section 4 of Executive Order 12686, the commission disbanded on June 15, 1990.

== Purposes ==
- Study and evaluate existing U.S. aviation policies and practices regarding terrorist threats.
- Investigate options of informing U.S. aviation customers of possible terrorist threats
- Review U.S. laws, policies, and practices dealing with the families of terrorists' victims.
- Carry out these provisions with particular attention to the destruction of Pan Am Flight 103, but without jeopardizing on-going intelligence and criminal operations.

== Membership ==
- Ann McLaughlin Korologos, (Chair) former Secretary of Labor (1987–1989)
- Edward Hidalgo former Secretary of the Navy (1979–1981)
- General Thomas C. Richards USAF (Ret.) Former Deputy Commander-in-Chief, HQ, U.S. Army European Command (1986–1989)

The enabling Executive Order required the President to appoint 4 Commission members from the U.S. Congress: 1 Republican Representative, 1 Democratic Representative, 1 Republican Senator, and 1 Democratic Senator.

- Alfonse D'Amato Senator (R-NY)
- John Paul Hammerschmidt Representative (R-AR3)
- Frank Lautenberg. Senator (D-NJ)
- Jim Oberstar Representative (DFL-MN8)

== Public hearings ==
- November 17, 1989

Testimony from

-family members of Pan Am Flight 103 victims
-aviation community representatives (pilots, flight attendants, airlines, airport personnel)
-consumer groups

- December 18, 1989

Reports of findings from

-the General Accounting Office (GAO)
-the Federal Aviation Administration (FAA) on aviation security

Testimony from the State Department on dealings with victims' families

- February 2, 1990

Testimony on counter-terrorist and aviation security technologies from

-scientists from the Massachusetts Institute of Technology, the Naval Research Laboratory, George Washington University, Los Alamos National Laboratory
-the FAA
-airport security experts
-security technology manufacturers

- March 9, 1990

Testimony from

-The Hon. Dante B. Fascell Representative (D-FL), Chair of the U.S. House. Foreign Affairs Committee. on international aviation security
-U.S. Embassy in Moscow personnel on the "Helsinki Warning".
-Pan Am representatives about their personnel's responses to the "Helsinki Warning".

- April 4, 1990

-Testimony from executives of American Airlines, Pan Am, United Air Lines, and Trans World Airlines
-Testimony from FAA Director of Civil Aviation Security Raymond Salazer on aviation security policy issues.

== Findings ==
- The sabotage of Pan Am Flight 103 quite possibly could have been averted if proper security safeguards had been in place.
- The FAA's security system continues to target aviation hijackings instead of organized terrorists' bombs.
- Intelligence operations are fragmented among individual airlines and several agencies. Intelligence operations are low key in importance.
- Technology research and development of counterterrorism devices lag behind terrorists' activities.
- Neither the State Department nor the FAA have quick response programs to give aid and assistance to the victims and families of aviation terrorism.

== Recommendations ==
The Executive Order enabling the commission required its final report to be screened for classified information. Only an unclassified text would be released to the general public The Final Report contained 64 specific recommendations summarized below in categories used by the commission.

=== International security ===
- The U.S. State Department—not American aviation corporations—should be the aviation leader in international security matters
- The U.S. State Department should create a Coordinator for International Aviation Security with the diplomatic rank of Ambassador.
- This ambassador should work closely with the United Nations International Civil Aviation Organization in international security matters.
- The existing 1978 international policy on aviation terrorism is insufficient. The U.S. should exhort its economic allies to create stronger multilateral and bilateral alliances to combat aviation terrorism.

=== Domestic security ===
- The Federal Aviation Administration (FAA) should continue to be the aviation leader in domestic security measures, but partner with the FBI in assessing all aviation threats.
- The FAA should plan and implement additional security measures into domestic aviation over time.
- Commercial air carriers must report all security threats to the FAA.
- Public safety authorities are responsible for when and how searches of aircraft, passengers, and facilities are carried out in response to security threats.

=== Mail and cargo ===
- Commercial air carriers have the first responsibility for screening air mail and air cargo.

=== The FAA ===
- The FAA should establish an office of security reporting directly to the FAA Administrator.
- The FAA should ensure adequate security staffing at all airports, international and domestic.
- The FAA should be responsible for training security staff.
- The FAA should develop technology for screening both passengers and checked baggage.

=== Research and development ===
The FAA should vigorously foster research and development of

- explosive detection systems
- aircraft frames capable of withstanding small amounts of explosives
- proactive security planning for future forms of terrorism and security threats.

=== Intelligence ===
- The FAA should work with the FBI in monitoring, analyzing, and confronting possible aviation security threats in U.S. airports.
- The new office of Assistant Secretary of Transportation for Security and Intelligence should work with the Central Intelligence Agency in monitoring, analyzing, and confronting possible international aviation security threats.
- Memoranda of Understanding and written working agreements among the FAA, intelligence agencies, and law enforcement regarding aviation security measures should be regularly reviewed and updated when appropriate.

=== Threat notification ===
- The security bulletins of the Overseas Security Advisory Council and the State Department's Overseas Security Electronic Bulleting Board should be routed to the State Department's Bureau of Consular Affairs. This Bureau should guarantee timely public access to the information.
- The State Department, The Justice Department, and the United States Department of Transportation will cooperate in creating additional mechanisms to notify the traveling public of potential domestic and international aviation terrorism threats.

=== Treatment of the families of victims of terror ===
- The State Department should be responsible for the needs of victims of international terrorism as well as their families. Specific procedures and personnel must be assigned to deal with matters of notification, direct aid for survivors, injury, death, and bereavement.
- The U.S. should create special funds to compensate U.S. citizens and permanent residents for all economic and non-economic damages resulting from international aviation terrorism.

=== National will ===
- Terrorist attacks must not be allowed to disrupt U.S. political and economic interests.
- State-sponsored terrorism and safe havens for terrorists must be identified and isolated through international cooperation.
- The U.S. government must actively punish state sponsors of terrorism and safe havens for terrorists.
- These punishments include preemptive or retaliatory actions carried out directly or covertly.
- "National will—and the moral courage to use it—is the ultimate means to defeat terrorism."

== Aviation Security Improvement Act of 1990 ==
Rep. James L. Oberstar, a member of the commission, introduced HR 5732, "Aviation Security Improvement Act of 1990" on September 27, 1990, in the second session of the 101st United States Congress. This bill embodied nearly all of the recommendations of the commission. It became Public Law 101–604 on November 16, 1990.

== Sources ==
- Report of the President's Commission on Aviation Security and Terrorism (Washington, DC: GPO, 1990) 182 pages.
- U.S. House. Foreign Affairs Committee. Report of the President's Commission on International Aviation Security and Terrorism. Hearings 101st Cong, 2nd Sess. May 17, 1990. (Washington, DC: GPO, 1990), 190 p.
- Donna Batten, et al. Encyclopedia of Governmental Advisory Organizations (Detroit, MI: Gale, 2009–2010).
