= Kathleen Carey =

Health economist

Kathleen Carey is a health economist and Professor in the Department of Health Law, Policy and Management at the Boston University School of Public Health. As a member of the Massachusetts Public Health Council, "she holds the governor-appointed seat representing the Massachusetts Coalition for the Prevention of Medical Errors." She began her six year term in December 2019.

== Education ==
- Boston University, PhD Economics
- Harvard University, MAT Education
- Le Moyne College, BS Mathematics

== Publications ==
- Carey, K., Dor, A. (2008). Expense preference behavior and management “outsourcing”: A comparison of adopters and non-adopters of contract management in U.S. hospitals. Journal of Productivity Analysis, 29(1), 61-75.
- Medicare's Hospital Compare quality reports appear to have slowed price increases for two major procedures
- Price Variations and Their Trends in U.S. Hospitals
