= Le Moyne College =

Private Jesuit college in DeWitt, New York, U.S.

Coordinates: 43.048098°N 76.086441°W

- Motto: Totus in Domino Jesu
- Motto in English: Everything in the Lord Jesus
- Type: Private college
- Established: 1946; 80 years ago
- Religious affiliation: Roman Catholic (Jesuit)
- Academic affiliations: AJCU, NCEA
- Endowment: $289.8 million (2025)
- President: Linda M. LeMura
- Faculty: 172 Full-time (fall 2021)
- Students: 3,409 (fall 2021)
- Undergraduates: 2,801 (fall 2021)
- Postgraduates: 608 (fall 2021)
- Location: DeWitt, New York (Note: Le Moyne College's campus, including all the buildings used for academic purposes, has a Syracuse mailing address but lies primarily within the adjacent town of DeWitt.), U.S.
- Campus: Urban and suburban, 160 acres (64.7 ha)
- Newspaper: The Dolphin
- Colors: Green & gold
- Nickname: Dolphins
- Sporting affiliations: NCAA Division I – NEC
- Mascot: Iggy the Dolphin
- Website: lemoyne.edu

Le Moyne College is a private Jesuit college located mostly in DeWitt, New York. It was founded by the Jesuits in 1946 and named after the Jesuit missionary Simon Le Moyne. Le Moyne was the first co-educational Jesuit college in the United States.

== History ==
Founded by the Society of Jesus in 1946, and named after the Jesuit missionary Simon Le Moyne, the college has graduated more than 35,000 students as of 2021. At its founding, Le Moyne was the first Jesuit co-educational college in the United States.

Walter A. Foery, the Roman Catholic Bishop of Syracuse, helped bring about the formation of Le Moyne College. Foery proposed to provide for the city of Syracuse "a truly American school with religion and morality as the foundation stones". The college's first home was a storefront on East Onondaga Street in Syracuse. Later, it moved to the Hiscock Mansion on James Street. The college moved to its current campus in 1948.

In 2014, Linda LeMura, formerly the college's provost and academic vice president, was appointed as the 14th president of Le Moyne College. LeMura is the first laywoman to serve as president of a Jesuit college or university.

As of 2020, the college enrolled more than 3,700 students. In 2022, Le Moyne received 7,066 undergraduate applications, which represents an increase of 5.31% annually. There was an 78.3% acceptance rate.

== Campus ==
Le Moyne College's 160-acre (0.65 km^{2}) campus is mostly located in the De Witt census-designated place, in the suburban town of DeWitt, including all of the buildings used for academic purposes. A small portion of the campus is within the city of Syracuse. As of 2021, there are 35 buildings on the campus.

== Academics ==
Le Moyne College consists of the Carroll College of Arts & Sciences, the Madden College of Business & Economics, and the Purcell School of Professional Studies. Le Moyne College offers Bachelor of Arts and Bachelor of Science degrees in over 100 undergraduate programs of study, Masters and Doctoral degrees in healthcare, education, and business, and several certificate programs. Among the most popular majors are Psychology, Nursing, Biological Sciences, Business, and Political Science.

== Traditions ==
=== Dolphy Day ===
Another annual tradition at Le Moyne College is "Dolphy Day", which originated in 1971. Dolphy Day is named for Eric Dolphy and has been said to have been inspired by Frank Zappa's song, "The Eric Dolphy Memorial Barbecue". Although Le Moyne's mascot is a dolphin, campus officials say there is no direct relation between the name of this event and this college icon. Each year, a "Wizard" is chosen (by the preceding Wizard).

== Green initiatives ==
In June 2010, the college began construction on a new, 48,000-square-foot (4,500 m^{2}) science facility. The science complex provides teaching and research space for use by faculty and students in the science and health professions. Its environmentally-sound design features include day lighting, solar preheating, and thermal storage, resulting in the award of LEED-Gold certification.

== Athletics ==
The Le Moyne Dolphins are the athletic teams for the college. As of July 1, 2023, Le Moyne competes in NCAA Division I as a member of the Northeast Conference (NEC). Previously, Le Moyne competed in the NCAA at the Division II level through the 2022–23 school year with 21 varsity teams, offering participation opportunities for over 340 students. Since 2003, Le Moyne men's lacrosse has won six NCAA Division II national championships. Previously, Le Moyne competed in the Northeast-10 Conference in all sports, but started a transition to Division I on July 1, 2023, as a new member of the NEC. All Le Moyne teams compete in the NEC.

== Notable alumni ==
- Bob Antonacci, former NYS Senate member, NYS Supreme Court judge
- Carmen Amato, author and retired CIA officer
- Kris M. Balderston, public affairs consultant; former managing director of the Global Partnership Initiative and deputy special representative for global partnerships in the Office of the US Secretary of State; former deputy chief of staff, US Senator Hillary Clinton
- Thomas J. Barrett, former Deputy Secretary of Transportation, United States Department of Transportation (USDOT), and retired Vice Admiral, United States Coast Guard (USCG)
- Tom Browning (1960–2022), retired Major League Baseball pitcher for the Cincinnati Reds and Kansas City Royals
- Henry Braden (1944–2013), African-American politician in New Orleans, Louisiana
- Ann Marie Buerkle, former Republican United States Congresswoman, New York's 25th congressional district (2010–2012) and current acting commissioner of the U.S. Consumer Product Safety Commission
- Kathleen Carey, health economist and professor
- Scott Cassidy, former Major League Baseball pitcher and as of 2025, the head coach of Le Moyne's baseball team
- Lorrie Clemo, 15th president of D'Youville College
- Kate Clinton, feminist humorist
- Nina Davuluri, Miss America 2014 completed nine pre-med courses at Le Moyne.
- Tom DeFalco, former editor-in-chief, Marvel Comics
- Tim DeKay, actor
- Jim Deshaies, former Major League Baseball pitcher and currently a TV commentator with the Chicago Cubs
- Isaiah Eisendorf (born 1996), American-Israeli basketball player in the Israeli Basketball Premier League
- Laurence Ekperigin (born 1988), British-American basketball player in the Israeli National League
- Jeanette J. Epps, retired NASA astronaut
- Siobhan Fallon Hogan, actress, Forrest Gump, Boiler Room, Saturday Night Live, Seinfeld, Men in Black, Holes, The Negotiator, Baby Mama
- Dennis Gorski (1944-2021), former Erie County, New York county executive and Cheektowaga, New York town justice
- Josiah Gray, Major League Baseball pitcher for the Washington Nationals
- Michael Charles Green, executive deputy commissioner of the NYS Department of Criminal Justice Services
- Scott Hicks, former men's basketball head coach of Loyola Maryland
- Mary Jacobus (1956–2009), former president and chief operating officer of The New York Times Company
- William D. Law, retired president of St. Petersburg College in Florida
- Rob Manfred, commissioner of Major League Baseball. Attended Le Moyne from 1976 to 1978.
- Jerome McGann, scholar of literary editing
- Timothy F. Murphy, professor of philosophy in the biomedical sciences
- Peter Muserlian, CEO Pemco Group Inc.
- Neil Olshey, consultant, Philadelphia 76ers; former general manager of the Los Angeles Clippers
- Andy Parrino, former Major League Baseball player
- Augusto Perez, paralympic curler
- Eugene F. Pigott Jr., retired judge, New York Court of Appeals
- Nicholas J. Pirro, former Onondaga County executive
- Tenzin Priyadarshi, director of The Dalai Lama Center for Ethics and Transformative Values at the Massachusetts Institute of Technology (MIT)
- Nancy Pyle, (1938–2023) former San Jose City Council member
- Jon Ratliff, former Major League Baseball pitcher, appeared in one game for the Oakland Athletics
- Antonio Reynoso, borough president of Brooklyn
- Don Savage (1928–2010), former professional basketball player for the Syracuse Nationals
- Carl Schramm, former president and CEO, Ewing Marion Kauffman Foundation
- Charles J. Siragusa, judge of the United States District Court for the Western District of New York
- John Douglas Thompson, Shakespearean actor
- Russell Tracy (1949-2026), noted epidemiological scientist and pathologist; former University Distinguished Professor of Pathology, Laboratory Medicine and Biochemistry at the Robert Larner College of Medicine, University of Vermont.
- Jim Wessinger, former Major League Baseball second baseman for the Atlanta Braves; first Le Moyne player to be selected in the MLB Draft
- Valerie Woods, 12th Speaker of the House of Representatives of Belize
- James Zogby, founder and president of the Arab American Institute based in Washington, D.C.
- John Zogby, Political analyst and former president and CEO, Zogby International
- José Zúñiga, actor

== Faculty and administrators ==
Among those faculty and administrators who serve or have served on the Le Moyne campus are:

- Carmen Basilio (1927–2012), former physical education teacher at Le Moyne and a former world champion boxer
- John Beilein, former head men's basketball coach at Le Moyne from 1983 to 1992 and former head men's basketball coach at the University of Michigan, 2007–2019
- Patrick Beilein, former head men's basketball coach at Le Moyne from 2015 to 2019 and current head men's basketball coach at Mohawk Valley Community College
- Daniel Berrigan (1921–2016), former professor of New Testament studies and founder of the International House at Le Moyne, social activist, author, poet
- George Coyne (1933–2020), inaugural McDevitt Chair of Religious Philosophy at Le Moyne and former head of the Vatican Observatory
- John M. Corridan (1911–1984), former economics professor at Le Moyne and the inspiration for the character of Father Barry in the classic film On the Waterfront
- Frank Haig, former president of Le Moyne from 1981 to 1987 and younger brother of former U.S. Secretary of State Alexander Haig
- John J. McNeill (1925–2015), former professor at Le Moyne, noted peace activist during the Vietnam War and an advocate for LGBT rights
- Joseph M. McShane former professor and chair of religious studies at Le Moyne and president emeritus of Fordham University
- J. Donald Monan (1924–2017), administrator and faculty member at Le Moyne from 1961 through 1972, later served as president of Boston College from 1972 to 1996
- Steve Owens (baseball), former head men's baseball coach at Le Moyne from 2000 to 2010 and current head men's baseball coach at Rutgers University
- Dave Paulsen, former head men's basketball coach at Le Moyne from 1997 to 2000 and current head men's basketball coach at the College of the Holy Cross
- Harold Ridley (1939–2005), former professor, English Department chair, and chief academic officer at Le Moyne and former president of Loyola College in Maryland
- Margaret C. Snyder, first dean of women at Le Moyne and a noted social scientist with a special interest in women and economic development, particularly in Africa.

== See also ==
- List of Jesuit sites
