= Norman A. Scotch =

American medical anthropologist and academic (1928–2014)

- Born: 30 Sep 1928; Boston, Massachusetts, U.S.
- Died: November 25, 2014 (aged 86); Sarasota, Florida
- Education: Boston University (BA, MA), Northwestern University (PhD), Harvard University (MPH)
- Known for: Founding Dean of Boston University School of Public Health, pioneer in medical anthropology and cross-cultural studies on hypertension
- Spouse: Freda
- Children: 3: 2 sons (Stephen and Kenneth) and 1 daughter (Ruth)
- Scientific career
- Fields: Medical anthropology, public health
- Workplaces: Boston University, Harvard University, Johns Hopkins University, Northwestern University, Washington State University

Norman A. Scotch (September 30, 1928 – November 25, 2014) was an American medical anthropologist and academic who was instrumental in founding the Boston University School of Public Health (BUSPH), initially established within the Boston University School of Medicine in 1976 and officially designated as a standalone school in 1979. Norman A. Scotch served as the founding dean of the Boston University School of Public Health. He was recognized for his work in ethnomedicine, public health, and anthropology.

== Early life and education ==
Norman A. Scotch was born in 1928 in Dorchester, Massachusetts, to a working-class family. His mother (Sarah (Sarah bat Naoch) Kaplovitch) was a homemaker from Lithuania, and his father (Samuel Scotch) was a bricklayer from Russia. He had one older brother, Bernard, and one sister, Eleanor. As a youth, Scotch attended art school at night while in high school, engaging in painting, photography, sculpting, and acting. He struggled academically and was considered the class clown. Despite his parents’ lack of emphasis on education, Scotch was self-motivated, reading the encyclopedia brought home by his older brother.

After graduating high school in 1946, Scotch served in the U.S. Army as an occupational counselor at a separation center for soldiers returning from World War II. He later used the G.I. Bill to attend Boston University, where he earned a B.A. in psychology and a master’s in sociology. He went on to complete a Ph.D. in anthropology at Northwestern University and later received a master's in public health from Harvard University under a Russell Sage Foundation fellowship.

== Academic career ==
Scotch was among the first scholars to help establish medical anthropology as a formal field of study in the United States. In his 1963 article "Medical Anthropology," he emphasized the significance of integrating sociocultural analysis into the study of health and illness, noting that anthropology had only recently begun to explore such dimensions. He is often credited with helping to coin and popularize the term "ethnomedicine" in this context.

Scotch's early research also included a study of hypertension among the Zulu population in South Africa, which helped demonstrate how cultural and environmental factors such as urbanization and social stress influence health outcomes. His work, along with that of contemporaries like William Caudill and Steven Polgar, is frequently cited in overviews of the emergence of medical anthropology as a distinct discipline.

At Northwestern, Scotch was deeply involved in the anthropology community and is reported to have lived in "Anthro House" and studied the cello during his time there."

Scotch initially sought to conduct fieldwork in Africa to study hypertension among the Zulu people but was denied a grant by the Ford Foundation. He gained support from Jerry Stamler at the Northwestern Medical School and received a grant from the U.S. Public Health Service, leading to what he considered the first serious paper in medical anthropology. He is also credited with coining the term "ethnomedicine."

Before going to Africa, Scotch conducted fieldwork among the Washoe people in Nevada, where he measured blood pressure as part of an epidemiology study and analyzed the relationship between stress, social integration, and health. He was assisted by his wife, Frieda, and stayed at the Stewart Indian School.

His Zulu research resulted in over 30 publications related to hypertension and diet, placing him at the forefront of cross-cultural studies in cardiovascular health. Dr. Norman A. Scotch conducted extensive fieldwork in South Africa, particularly among Zulu communities, to examine the sociocultural factors influencing hypertension. His seminal 1963 study, *Sociocultural Factors in the Epidemiology of Zulu Hypertension*, published in the *American Journal of Public Health*, remains a cornerstone in understanding the intersection of culture, stress, and cardiovascular health. While the exact number of his publications on this topic is not specified in the available sources, his work is recognized for its significant contribution to cross-cultural cardiovascular research.

Scotch held teaching positions at Washington State University, Harvard University, and Johns Hopkins University, where he and Sol Levine established a new department. At Harvard, his work contributed to the book Social Stress. At Johns Hopkins, he collaborated on longitudinal studies with the Framingham Heart Study on stress and heart disease. Scotch achieved tenure and became a full professor at age 38.

He also spent time as a visiting professor at the University of California, San Diego and worked at the Salk Institute on studies of alcoholism.

== Boston University School of Public Health ==
In 1972, Scotch joined the Boston University School of Medicine where he established a new department that would evolve into the Boston University School of Public Health (BUSPH). The school was officially established in 1976 as a program and gained full status as a school within BU in 1979.

Scotch served as the founding dean and played a pivotal role in shaping the academic structure, overseeing its accreditation, and integrating academic and professional expertise. The school's conceptual design is credited to Dr. Douglas K. Decker, who developed the admission criteria, curriculum, and the teaching approach that allowed working professionals (managers, nurses, and doctors) to attend evening classes. Dr. Douglas K. Decker played a pivotal role in designing the admission criteria, curriculum, teaching approach, and schedule for the Boston University School of Public Health (BUSPH), contributing significantly to its establishment. Notably, Bob Biblo, founding President of the Harvard Community Health Plan, was both a graduate and professor at BUSPH. He served as the organization's leader from 1970 to 1978, overseeing its growth and the implementation of innovative healthcare models.

Scotch brought academic credibility and administrative experience, while Decker provided the vision and operational leadership necessary to launch the institution. Their collaboration is considered essential to the successful founding of BUSPH.

An annual Norman A. Scotch Award is given by BUSPH to honor his legacy and contributions. The Boston University School of Public Health established the Norman A. Scotch Award for Excellence in Teaching to honor Dr. Scotch's legacy as the founding dean. This award is presented annually to a faculty member who has made outstanding and sustained contributions to the education program at BUSPH. The awardee receives an engraved Revere bowl and a $1,000 prize, and their name is inscribed on the Scotch Award tray displayed in the Founder’s Room of the Talbot Building.

== Retirement and later work ==
Scotch retired in 1992 but continued to work part-time at the Join Together substance-abuse program, funded by the Robert Wood Johnson Foundation. He also pursued artistic and literary interests, including screenwriting. He died January 25, 2014, in Sarasota, Florida.

== Oral histories ==
Three oral history audiotapes of Dr. Scotch’s personal and professional reminiscences are held by the Boston University School of Public Health. These interviews cover his early life, academic journey, fieldwork among the Washoe and Zulu peoples, teaching experiences, and reflections on the evolution of anthropology and public health education.

- Tape 1 includes discussion of his early life, education, and early fieldwork.
- Tape 2 details his Washoe fieldwork and Zulu research.
- Tape 3 covers his academic posts, founding of BUSPH, and retirement activities.

== Legacy ==
Scotch is remembered as a pioneering figure in medical anthropology, a co-founder of BUSPH, as well as an educator and administrator. His interdisciplinary approach—linking anthropology, public health, and clinical research—has made an important contribution to the development of global health studies and education.

== See also ==
- Boston University School of Public Health
- Medical anthropology
- Ethnomedicine
- Framingham Heart Study
