= Sarah Degnan Kambou =

American non-profit organization executive

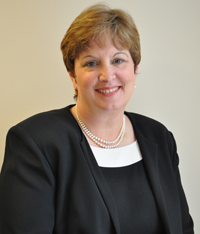
- Education: University of Connecticut; Boston University
- Occupations: President, International Center for Research on Women (ICRW)

Sarah Degnan Kambou is president of the International Center for Research on Women (ICRW), a global research institute that focuses on making women integral to alleviating poverty worldwide.

== Biography ==
Kambou grew up in New Hampshire and received her education at the University of Connecticut and Boston University. She cofounded and for eight years served as a director of the Center for International Health in the Boston University School of Public Health. While there, Kambou directed intensive training programs for international health professionals, managed BU’s collaborative programs with Tongji Medical University in China and Tribhuvan University in Nepal, and consulted widely across South and Southeast Asia.

Kambou later lived in sub-Saharan Africa for more than a decade, where she managed programs for CARE (relief agency). There, Degnan Kambou focused on addressing social and economic vulnerability of marginalized populations, strengthening civil society in post-conflict settings and participatory development of underserved urban and rural communities. She also established the CARE country office in Ivory Coast during the civil conflict and designed community-led reproductive health programs in post-conflict Rwanda, Sudan and Somaliland.

Prior to being named president, Kambou served as ICRW’s chief operating officer, coordinating internal leadership and management functions, and leading the implementation of the organization’s restructuring and strategic review processes. Earlier, as ICRW’s vice president of health and development, she oversaw research in HIV and AIDS, reproductive health and nutrition as well as in gender, violence and women’s rights.

In 2010, Kambou was appointed by United States Secretary of State Hillary Clinton to represent ICRW on the U.S. National Commission for the United Nations Educational, Scientific and Cultural Organization (UNESCO).

Kambou was honored in 2010 with the Boston University School of Public Health's Distinguished Alumni Award for her contributions to the field of public health.

== Education ==
Kambou holds a doctorate in international health policy and a master’s in public health from Boston University. She earned her bachelor's degree in French from the University of Connecticut.

== Expertise ==
Kambou is an expert in sexual and reproductive health, HIV and AIDS and adolescent programming. She has worked in 26 countries and dedicated more than 25 years to addressing issues in the developing world.

== Publications ==
- "Exploring Dimensions of Masculinity and Violence"
- "Walking the Talk: Inner Spaces, Outer Faces, A Gender and Sexuality Initiative"
- "Gendered Empowerment and HIV Prevention: Policy and Programmatic Pathways to Success in the MENA Region"

== Speeches and statements ==
- "Education a Key for Girls in Developing World" G(irls)20 Summit in Toronto, June 16, 2010
- "A Message From ICRW President Sarah Degnan Kambou" July 7, 2010
