= Peter Muserlian =

American developer (born 1956)

Peter E. Muserlian
- Born: May 12, 1956 (age 70); United States
- Occupation: Real state developer
- Known for: Primary owner of Pemco Group
- Spouse: Nancy
- Children: 2

Peter Muserlian (born May 12, 1956) is an American developer and notable Republican political campaign contributor. Muserlian is the primary owner of Pemco Group, a large development and leasing agency located in Syracuse, New York.

Located in central New York, Pemco is among the region's largest commercial real estate and development agencies, with property interests locally and as far south as Manassas, Virginia. Muserlian is widely credited with the company’s growth in an otherwise unfavorable economic climate.

== Early life ==
Muserlain is a graduate of Manlius Pebble Hill School and attended Le Moyne College.

== Developments ==
=== Hills Building ===
Serving as Pemco’s primary headquarters, Muserlian purchased the historic Hills Building at 317 Montgomery St. in Syracuse, NY. Following a foreclosure filing from General Electric Capital Interests against the former building residents (Tower Associates), Muserlian orchestrated a below market buy on the property and structure for $625,000 in the year 2000. Built in 1929, in the same era as the historic Landmark Theater and Niagara Mohawk building, the Gothic architecture is reminiscent of NYC buildings of the same era.

=== Shop City ===
Shop City is a large retail plaza located in the Northeast side of Syracuse. Muserlian’s father had originally been involved in a leasing partnership of the property dating back to the mid-1960s. In 1999, Muserlian orchestrated the sale of the 250,000-square-foot (23,000 m^{2}) property to Paragon Realty Group out of Connecticut for $16.25 million.

=== Syracuse Trust Building ===
Built in the early 1900s, the Syracuse Trust Building at 325 South Salina St. served for many years as one of Syracuse's leading financial institutions. Muserlian's project range involved the conversion of the historic structure into five luxury condos ranging in size from 2,200 to 2,500 square feet.

== Political activism and contributions ==
Muserlian is a Republican campaign donor, supporting both local New York State Assembly candidate Christina Fitch and national candidates, including President George W. Bush's first election campaign.

== Personal life ==
Muserlian lives in Fayetteville, New York, with wife Nancy and two children, Peter Muserlian Jr and Jane H. Muserlian.
