= Jim Oberstar =

American politician (1934–2014)

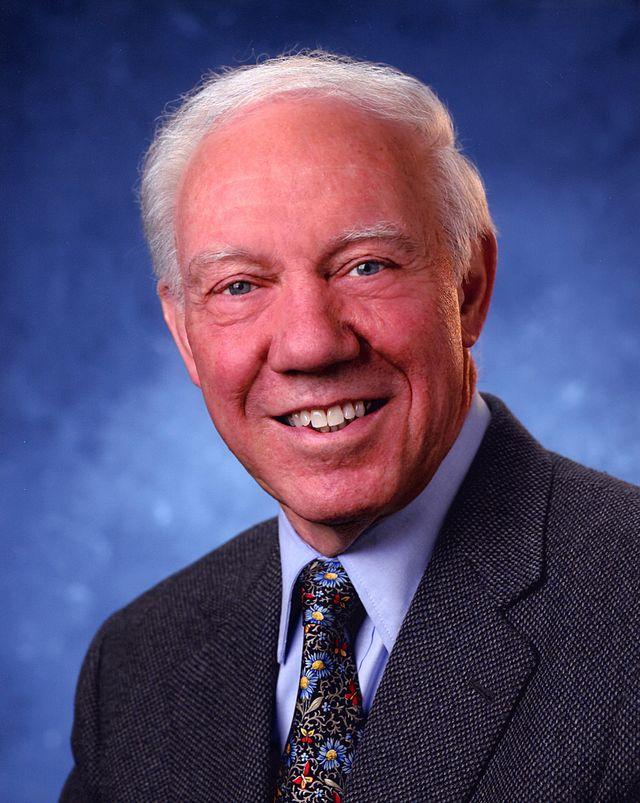
- Official portrait, 2009

Chair of the House Transportation Committee
- In office January 3, 2007 – January 3, 2011
- Preceded by: Don Young
- Succeeded by: John Mica

Ranking Member of the House Transportation Committee
- In office October 10, 1995 – January 3, 2007
- Preceded by: Norman Mineta
- Succeeded by: John Mica

Member of the U.S. House of Representatives from Minnesota's 8th district
- In office January 3, 1975 – January 3, 2011
- Preceded by: John Blatnik
- Succeeded by: Chip Cravaack

Personal details
- Born: James Louis Oberstar; September 10, 1934 Chisholm, Minnesota, U.S.
- Died: May 3, 2014 (aged 79) Potomac, Maryland, U.S.
- Party: Democratic
- Spouse(s): Jo Garlick (deceased); Jean Kurth
- Children: 4
- Education: University of St. Thomas, Minnesota (BA); College of Europe (MA)
- Oberstar's voice Oberstar supporting the Maritime Pollution Prevention Act of 2008. Recorded March 26, 2007

James Louis Oberstar (September 10, 1934 – May 3, 2014) was an American politician and congressman who served in the United States House of Representatives from 1975 to 2011. Hailing from Minnesota and a member of the state's local Democratic–Farmer–Labor Party, he represented the northeastern eighth congressional district, which included the cities of Duluth, Brainerd, Grand Rapids, International Falls, and Hibbing, within an area of Minnesota known as the Iron Range. He chaired the House Transportation and Infrastructure Committee from 2007 until his departure, having been the ranking minority member since 1995. In November 2010, he was defeated by a margin of 4,407 votes by Republican Chip Cravaack. He had the longest tenure of any member of Congress from Minnesota.

== Early life, education and career ==
Oberstar was born in Chisholm, Minnesota, and on his deathbed, he still owned his original family home in Chisholm. His father Louis, of German ancestry, was an iron ore miner and the first card-carrying member of the United Steelworkers (USW) on the Iron Range of Minnesota. Oberstar also has Slovenian ancestry.

Oberstar graduated from Chisholm High School in 1952 and went on to the College of St. Thomas (now the University of St. Thomas) in St. Paul, Minnesota where he received his B.A. degree in 1956. He received a master's degree in European Studies from the College of Europe in Bruges, Belgium in 1957, with further study at Université Laval in Sainte-Foy, Quebec, Canada and Georgetown University in Washington, D.C.

He spent four years as a civilian language teacher in the United States Marine Corps, teaching English to Haitian military personnel and French to American Marine officers and noncommissioned officers.

He served on the staff of Minnesota's 8th District U.S. Representative John Blatnik for 12 years, from 1963 to 1974, rising to chief of staff. He was also the administrator of the Committee on Public Works for the U.S. House of Representatives from 1971 to 1974.

== U.S. House of Representatives ==
Oberstar was an internationally recognized expert on aviation and aviation safety. He served on the Transportation and Infrastructure Committee during his entire time in the House. (His predecessor Blatnik had chaired the committee, then known as the Public Works Committee, during his last two terms in Congress, with Oberstar as staff administrator.) He was also a member of the President's Commission on Aviation Security and Terrorism.

In 1965, Oberstar helped create the Economic Development Administration, the only federal agency devoted to the creation and retention of jobs in economically distressed American communities.

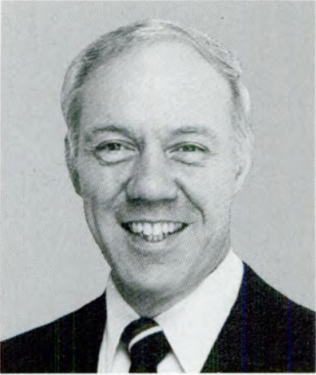
Oberstar in 1991

Oberstar was a strong supporter of the Duluth-based aircraft manufacturer Cirrus Aircraft and even helped bring the company to Minnesota in 1994 from its first home in Baraboo, Wisconsin. That same year, he assisted in passing the General Aviation Revitalization Act, which was said to have reinvigorated the general aviation industry nationwide.

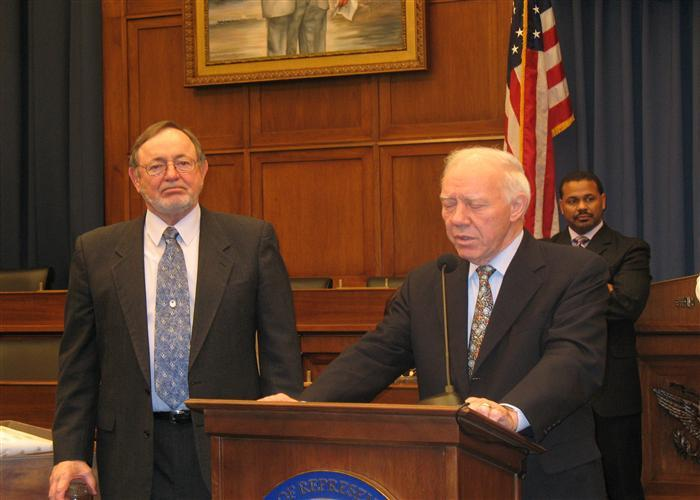
Congressman Don Young hands over the gavel to incoming Transportation Chairman Jim Oberstar on December 6, 2006.

An avid cyclist, Oberstar championed the creation of trails for cycling and hiking to promote active lifestyles. In 2005, he authored, co-sponsored, and helped to pass the SAFETEA-LU act, a $295 billion program that funded transportation infrastructure, including highways, bridges, and public transportation, such as subways, buses, and passenger ferries and which includes the Safe Routes to Schools program. At the 2007 BikeWalk California conference and other bicycling conferences, Oberstar advocated converting the U.S.'s transportation system "from a hydrocarbon-based system to a carbohydrate-based system."

He was rated the third most liberal member of the Minnesota delegation in the 109th Congress, scored at 13% by a conservative group and 86% progressive by a liberal group.

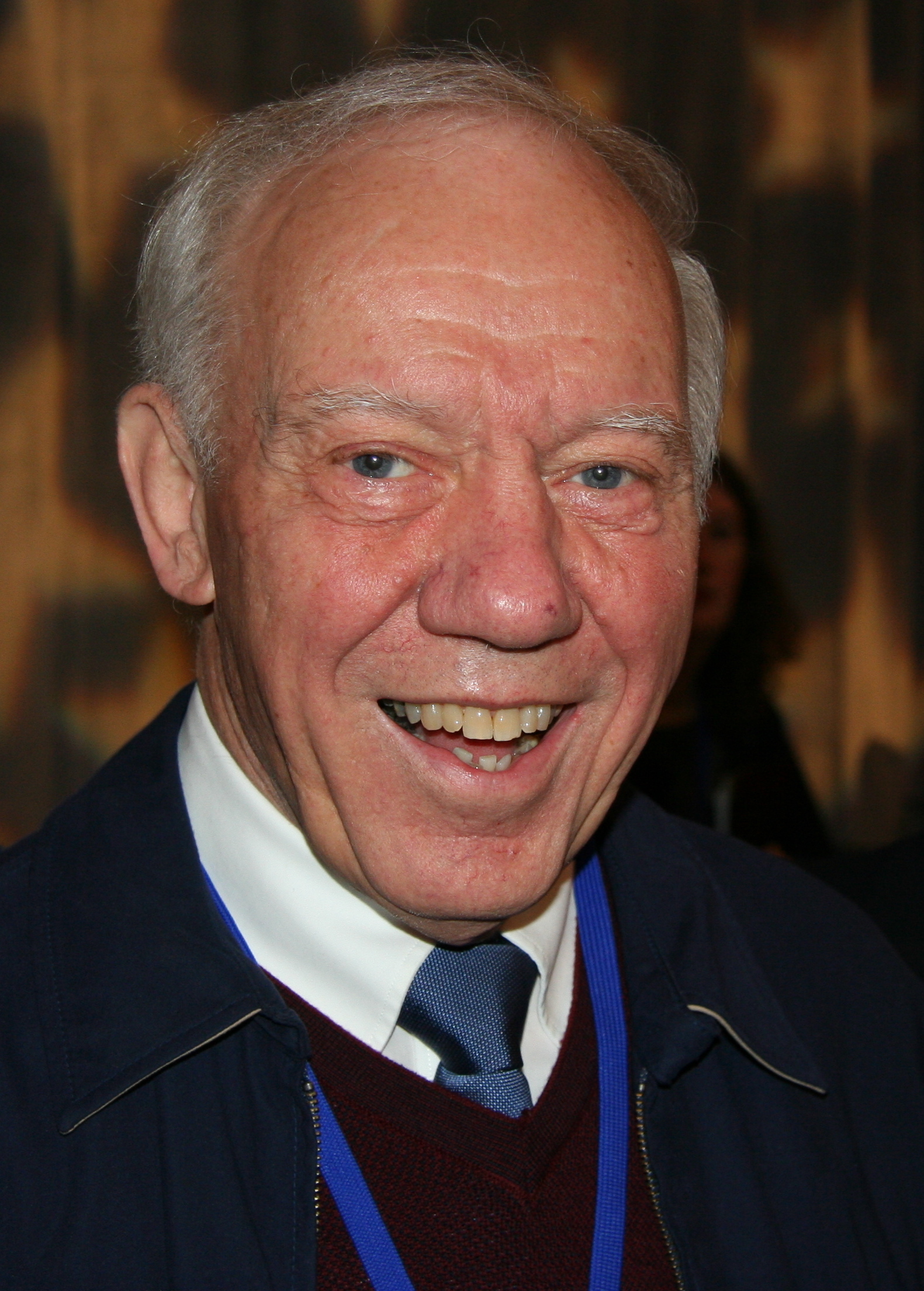
Oberstar in 2010

Along with John Conyers, in April 2006, Oberstar brought an action against George W. Bush and others alleging violations of the U.S. Constitution in the passage of the Deficit Reduction Act of 2005. The case, (Conyers v. Bush), was ultimately dismissed.

Within days after the collapse of the I-35W Mississippi River bridge, Oberstar introduced and succeeded in passing legislation to appropriate $250 million to the Minnesota Department of Transportation to quickly build a replacement bridge.

In 2004, Oberstar led the opposition to the Commercial Space Launch Amendments Act of 2004, a bill that established a regulatory framework for private suborbital spaceflight, arguing that the bill did not sufficiently safeguard passenger and crew safety. "I do not want to see people dead from a space experiment, and then the federal government comes in to regulate".

During his tenure in Congress, Oberstar held leadership positions on the House Transportation and Infrastructure Committee, was House Democratic At-Large Whip, and was a member of the executive committee of the Democratic Study Group. He also served on the International Relations Committee. He was co-chair of the Great Lakes Task Force and was a member of the Upper Mississippi Task Force and the Democratic Homeland Security Task Force. He co-chaired the Congressional Travel and Tourism Caucus and was a member of the following caucuses: the Bike Caucus; the Caucus for Sustainable Development; the Congressional Caucus on Global Road Safety; the Congressional Human Rights Caucus; the Congressional Steel Caucus; the Medical Technology Caucus; the Mississippi River Caucus; the Native American Caucus; and the Renewable Energy Caucus.

== Political positions ==
=== Social Issues ===
Oberstar was an anti-abortion Democrat, and believed it should only be allowed if the pregnancy resulted from rape or incest, or if the life of the mother was endangered. He sponsored multiple constitutional amendments to enshrine a right to life provision, and to prohibit abortion services unless the mother's life was in danger.

One of his first congressional achievements was the passage of an amendment in 1976 to prohibit federal funding of the procedure. While the amendment, known as the Hyde Amendment, was officially introduced by fellow freshman member Henry Hyde (R-IL), Oberstar formulated the text himself, handwriting it on a slip of paper; due to the appeal of a Republican co-sponsor, and Hyde's seat on the House Judiciary Committee, it was determined the amendment would have an easier chance of passing if Hyde introduced it. Prohibition of federal funding of abortion services, through the amendment, was one of the first legislative gains made by the anti-abortion movement after the Roe v. Wade decision, which legalized abortion nationwide.

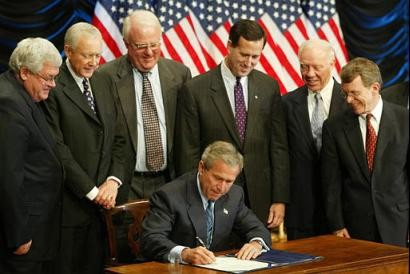
Oberstar (second from right), watching President George W. Bush sign the Partial-Birth Abortion Ban Act in 2003.

He voted in 2003 to ban intact dilation and extraction, also known as "partial-birth abortion", and was present at the bill's signing by President George W. Bush. He showed his full support in 2005–2006 to the National Right to Life Committee (NRLC). Oberstar voted against legislation in 2005 to require the Department of Health and Human Services (HHS) to research embryonic stem cells, and again in 2007, one of the only 14 and 16 Democratic members respectively to do so. He co-chaired the Congressional Pro-Life Caucus, along with Republican Chris Smith of New Jersey.

Oberstar supported the bill to move the Terri Schiavo case to federal court, and appeared at a press conference with then-House Majority leader Tom DeLay to urge its passage.

During his congressional tenure, Oberstar had a generally supportive record on LGBT rights. The Defense of Marriage Act passed in 1996 with the support of 118 House Democratic members, including Oberstar. However, after that vote he started to vote more in line with LGBT advocacy groups, such as the Human Rights Campaign (HRC), which gave him ratings of 86%, 88%, 69%, and 88% for the 108-111th Congress'. He voted in favor of making crimes motivated by discrimination against sexual orientation or gender identity a federal hate crime in 2009, and cosponsored a bill in 2003 to prohibit employment discrimination on the basis of sexual orientation.

=== Economic issues ===
Oberstar was a strong supporter of the Head Start Program, a national program from to promote school readiness by enhancing social and cognitive development of children through the provision of educational, health, nutritional, social, and other services. He considered it to be one of the most successful federal anti-poverty programs ever created. Oberstar also supported the American Association of University Women (AAUW), which has been a leading voice promoting education and equality for women and girls nationwide; he fully supported the AAUW in 2007 and 2008. Interest groups, like the American Association of University Women (AAUW) and the National Association of Elementary School Principals (NAESP), scored him at 100/100. In the early 1980s, Oberstar gave federal aid to the establishment of the Natural Resources Research Institute at the University of Minnesota Duluth to provide applied research and technology development to Minnesota's natural resource-based economy.

Oberstar was rated 100 by Environment America and the League of Conservation Voters in 2009. The American Wind Energy Association also gave him a rating of 100 in 2006. He voted to pass the Energy and Environmental Law Amendments, which aimed to establish a program to regulate greenhouse gas emissions in 2009. He also voted to pass a bill, Trade-in Vouchers for Fuel-Efficient Cars, in 2009, which granted a $3,500 voucher for trading in an old vehicle for one that got least 4 miles per gallon more, to increase the purchase of fuel-efficient cars. However, Oberstar went against most Democrats and voted in favor of allowing drilling in ANWR.

Oberstar was a strong supporter of organized labor. He was given an 100% rating by the AFL-CIO. Oberstar was also rated 92 by the American Federation of Government Employees in 2009 and 90 by Federally Employed Women in 2009. He voted for three unemployment benefits extension bills in 2010 and three Employment Discrimination Law Amendments in 2009.

According to the Minnesota Congressional Election 2008 Political Courage Test, Oberstar supported having taxation of corporate earnings, gasoline, and cigarettes. In 2008, Americans For Fair Taxation (AFFT) gave Oberstar their lowest possible rating, and the National Taxpayers Union gave Oberstar an "F". He supported a tax plan containing tax relief for working families, investment tax credits for small businesses, and support for the states, including incentives for transportation construction projects that would immediately put people back to work. Oberstar did not support free trade agreements, such as North American Free Trade Agreement (NAFTA) or the Central American Free Trade Agreement (CAFTA). He believed that free trade under NAFTA and CAFTA offered little or no economic opportunity for American workers and producers due to inadequate provisions in the agreements.

== Political campaigns ==
When John Blatnik opted not to run for a 15th term in 1974, he endorsed Oberstar as his successor. Oberstar won and was reelected 16 times without serious difficulty. Democrats Blatnik and Oberstar held the seat from 1947 until 2011. Oberstar's lowest winning percentage was 59 percent in 1992, but after that, until 2010, he did not earn less than 60 percent of the vote. He is the longest-serving member of either house of Congress in Minnesota's history, having served in the 94th through the 111th Congresses from January 3, 1975, to January 3, 2011.

During the 2006 elections, Oberstar's Republican opponent was former United States Senator Rod Grams, whose lived in the southwestern corner of the 8th. Grams was the first reasonably well-funded Republican to run in the 8th in decades. Although some polls showed Oberstar only ahead by two points, in the end, he won by over 30 points and did not lose a single county in his district.

During the 2008 elections, Oberstar's Republican opponent was political neophyte and businessman Michael Cummins. Cummins campaigned throughout the district but did not drum up enough support to pose a serious challenge to the veteran Democratic incumbent. Oberstar won with more than 67 percent of the vote. During the 2008 campaign, Oberstar appeared alongside other public officials in a TV ad supporting the reelection of Puerto Rico Governor Aníbal Acevedo Vilá, a fellow Democrat.

During the 2010 elections, Oberstar lost a close race to political newcomer and Tea Party favorite Chip Cravaack, who won a plurality of 48 percent of the vote. The race was seen nationwide as a major upset for Democrats.

== Electoral history ==
2010

2010 Minnesota's 8th congressional district election
Party	Candidate	Votes	%
Republican	Chip Cravaack	133,474	48.2
Democratic (DFL)	James Oberstar	129,067	46.6
Independence	Timothy Olson	11,876	4.3

2008

2008 Minnesota's 8th congressional district election
Party	Candidate	Votes	%
Democratic (DFL)	James Oberstar	240,586	67.6
Republican	Michael Cummins	114,588	32.2
	others	573	0.2

2006

2006 Minnesota's 8th congressional district election
Party	Candidate	Votes	%
Democratic (DFL)	James Oberstar	194,677	64
Republican	Rod Grams	101,744	34
Unaffiliated	Harry Welty	6,535	2

2004

2004 Minnesota's 8th congressional district election
Party	Candidate	Votes	%
Democratic (DFL)	James Oberstar	228,509	65
Republican	Mark Groettum	112,657	32
Green	Van Presley	8,931	3

2002

2002 Minnesota's 8th congressional district election
Party	Candidate	Votes	%
Democratic (DFL)	James Oberstar	193,959	69
Republican	Bob Lemen	88,423	31

== Personal life ==
Oberstar and his first wife, the former Jo Garlick, had four children; she died in 1991. He later married Jean Kurth. The couple lived in Potomac, Maryland, and also maintained Oberstar's boyhood home in Chisholm, Minnesota. Oberstar died at his home in Potomac on May 3, 2014, at the age of 79.

== Awards and honors ==
Bust of Oberstar located in the Duluth International Airport, now known as the "James L. Oberstar Terminal"

In 2009, Oberstar received the Tony Jannus Award for distinguished leadership in commercial aviation.

In May 2011, a Great Lakes ore carrier, of the Interlake Steamship Company, which typically transports taconite pellets from Duluth, Silver Bay and Marquette to steel mills near Detroit, Cleveland, and Chicago, was renamed after him, dubbed the MV Honorable James L. Oberstar.

On June 19, 2012, Oberstar was made Commander in the French Ordre national du Mérite.

In October 2015, the new passenger terminal of the Duluth International Airport was named in honor of Oberstar, who helped secure funding for the facility before its 2013 opening. A sculpture of him was also unveiled during the renamed terminal's introduction.

In 2016, he was posthumously inducted into the Minnesota Aviation Hall of Fame.

== Papers ==
The Congressional Papers of James L. Oberstar are available for research use. They include photographs, sound and video recordings, legislative materials, campaign and political activities, committee work, and legislative staff topical files documenting Oberstar's service as a U. S. Representative from Minnesota's 8th Congressional District (1975–2011). The collection emphasizes Oberstar's activities on the House Transportation and Infrastructure Committee, demonstrated by an extensive series of staff office topical files addressing various issues, projects, and legislation related to aviation, highways and bridges, railways, waterways, and bikeways. Additional significant content focuses on economic development in the Iron Range, travel and tourism, trade, and environmental protection of Minnesota's land and water resources.

== Boards and other affiliations ==
- Board Member, Board of Trustees, John F. Kennedy Center for the Performing Arts, 1995–2014
- Board Member, Mineta I.I.STPS Institute, San Jose State University, 1995–2014

== Works cited ==
- Day, Kristen (2006). Democrats For Life: Pro-Life Politics and the Silenced Majority. Green Forest, Arkansas: New Leaf Press (AR) (published August 1, 2006). ISBN 9780892216376.

U.S. House of Representatives
Preceded by John Blatnik	Member of the U.S. House of Representatives from Minnesota's 8th congressional district 1975–2011	Succeeded by Chip Cravaack
Preceded by Norman Mineta	Ranking Member of the House Transportation Committee; 1995–2007	Succeeded by John Mica
Preceded by Don Young	Chair of the House Transportation Committee; 2007–2011	Succeeded by John Mica
