= Linda M. LeMura =

American academic administrator (born 1960)

14th President of Le Moyne College
- Incumbent
- Assumed office July 1, 2014
- Preceded by: Fred P. Pestello

Personal details
- Born: April 25, 1960 (age 66) Syracuse, New York, U.S.
- Spouse: Lawrence Tanner
- Education: Niagara University (BS); Syracuse University (MS, PhD)

Linda M. LeMura (born April 25, 1960) is an American physiologist who has been the president of Le Moyne College in Syracuse, New York, since 2014. She is the first female layperson to be named the president of a Jesuit institution of higher education in the world.

Prior to being appointed president in 2014, LeMura served Le Moyne as the provost and vice president for academic affairs from 2007 to 2014 and dean of the College of Arts and Sciences from 2003 to 2007. Previously, she was professor, research scientist, and graduate program director of the Departments of Biology and Allied Health Sciences and Exercise Physiology at Bloomsburg University of Pennsylvania.

== Early life and education ==
LeMura grew up in Syracuse, New York, as one of six siblings of Italian immigrant parents. She graduated from Bishop Grimes High School in Syracuse where she was a three-sport athlete and an honors student. A first-generation college student, LeMura received a Bachelor of Science, summa cum laude, from Niagara University with majors in biology and education. In subsequent study at Syracuse University, she received an M.S. in 1983 and a Ph.D. in 1987 in applied physiology.

== Career ==
=== Bloomsburg University of Pennsylvania ===
LeMura was at Bloomsburg University from 1987 to 2003. LeMura was a professor and a research scientist in the departments of Biology and Health Sciences and Exercise Physiology. She served as Graduate Program Director and Interim Associate Dean of the College of Arts and Sciences. Her research interests include pediatric obesity, pediatric applied physiology, and lipid and energy metabolism. She is the author or co-author of over 30 scientific articles in peer-reviewed journals, a book review, 26 grant proposals, and two books. She has been a research consultant for the U.S. and the Italian Olympic Committees.

=== Le Moyne College ===
As Provost and Vice President for Academic Affairs at Le Moyne from 2007 to 2014, LeMura played a pivotal role in the establishment of the Madden School of Business and the revision of the College's Core Curriculum. She was appointed Dean of the College of Arts and Sciences in 2003.

LeMura is the current president of Le Moyne College, appointed unanimously by the College's Board of Trustees to that position, effective July 1, 2014. In December 2021, Le Moyne's Board of Trustees approved a four-year extension for LeMura, extending her contract through June 30, 2026. During her presidency, Le Moyne has achieved record-breaking fundraising and enrollment goals. The College completed the $100 million Always Forward campaign, the largest campaign in the College's 75-year history, ahead of schedule in February 2021.

In 2022, LeMura was appointed Co-Chair of the Central New York Regional Economic Development Council, on which she has served since 2015. The purpose of the Council is to promote the economic development of New York State and its communities, to encourage sound practices in the conduct of regional and statewide development programs, and to develop education programs that enhance the professional development skills of its members.

== Honors and affiliations ==
LeMura is on the boards of the Council of Independent Colleges and Universities, the College of the Holy Cross, and the Board of Directors of the Association of Jesuit Colleges and Universities, where she serves on both the Executive Committee and the Mission and Identity Advisory Committee. She also serves on the Board of the International Association of Jesuit Universities, where she was a founding delegate, and the Association of Catholic Colleges and Universities.

In 2019, LeMura received the Syracuse Key4Women Achieve Award, and the AT&T CNY Women in STEM, Partners for Education and Business, Inc. In 2017, she was named Citizen of the Year by Temple Adath Yeshurun, Syracuse, N.Y.; received the Bishop's Award from the Diocese of Syracuse Catholic Charities; and received the Ensuring Our Future Award from Cristo Rey New York High School. In 2016, Le Moyne College was named Non-profit Business of the Year by Centerstate CEO and LeMura was recognized as a Woman of Distinction by the New York State Senate.

== Personal life ==
LeMura is married to Lawrence Tanner, a professor of environmental systems science at Le Moyne College. They have one daughter.
