= Margaret Elizabeth Kruk =

American public health researcher and academic

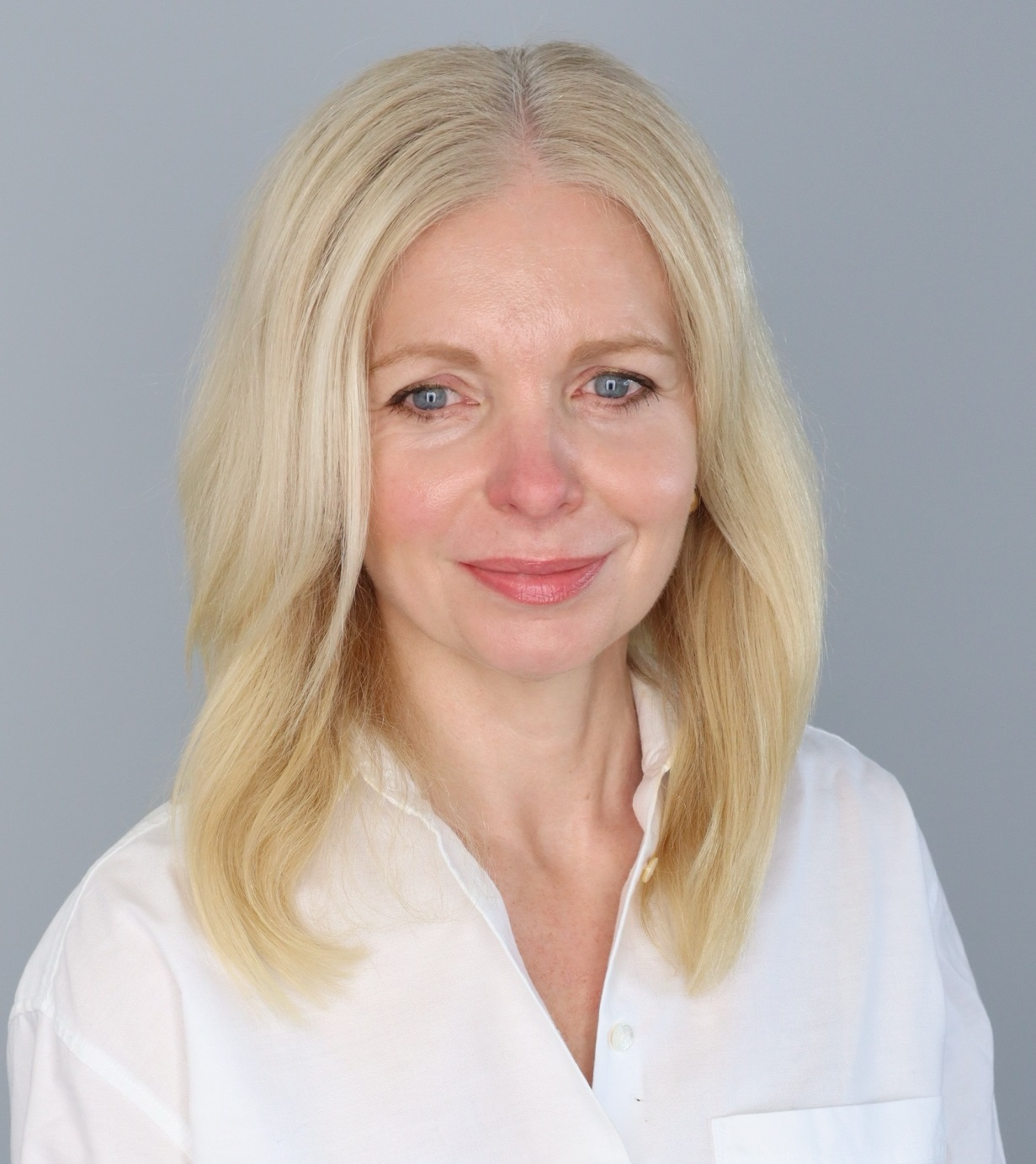
- Born
- Occupations: Public health expert, physician and health systems researcher
- Spouse: Sandro Galea

Academic background
- Education: McMaster University; Harvard University

Margaret Elizabeth Kruk is an American public health expert, physician and health systems researcher who is serving as Distinguished Professor of Health Systems and Medicine at Washington University in St. Louis.

Previously, she was Professor of Health Systems at the Harvard T.H. Chan School of Public Health and Director of the Quality of Evidence for Health Transformation (QuEST) Centers and Network.

Kruk is most known for her work on measuring health system quality and its impact on healthcare demand, health outcomes, and trust, using observational studies, implementation science and econometric methods. She has published more than 200 research articles and book chapters. In 2018, she chaired the Lancet Global Health Commission on High Quality Health Systems. She co-edited the third edition of the Disease Control Priorities book series and served on The Lancet Commissions on Investing in Health I and III, and the Institute of Medicine Committee on Health System Strengthening, among others. She also served as co-lead for the Bulletin of the World Health Organization Special Issue on Health Care Quality in the SDG Era.

== Education and early career ==
Kruk graduated from McMaster University with a bachelor's degree in Arts and Science in 1991, followed by a Doctor of Medicine degree in 1994. After completing her residency, she earned her medical license from the College of Physicians and Surgeons of Ontario in 1995 and board certification from the Canadian College of Family Physicians in 1996. Between 1996 and 1998, she was a Family and Emergency Physician and Chief of Staff at Geraldton District Hospital, and later worked as Interim Country Manager and Project Physician for Doctors without Borders (MSF) in Lebanon. In 1999, she enrolled at the Harvard School of Public Health, where she received a Master of Public Health degree in Health Policy and Management in 2000.

== Career ==
Kruk began her academic career at the University of Michigan School of Public Health, where she assumed the roles of assistant research scientist and lecturer before becoming an assistant professor in 2007. In 2010, she joined Columbia University as an assistant professor and became an associate professor in 2014. Subsequently, she was appointed associate professor of global health at the Harvard T.H. Chan School of Public Health in 2015. In 2019, she became a professor of health systems.

In 2020, Kruk became director of the Harvard QuEST Centers and Network, a multi-country research consortium focused on developing tools to assess health system quality, testing solutions to health system deficits, and supporting high-impact health systems research globally.

Prior to her roles in academia, Kruk served as the policy advisor for health for the UN Millennium Project and was an associate and later engagement manager for McKinsey and Company.

Kruk's policy engagement has extended to the Joint Health Systems Research Committee for the UK Department for International Development (DFID), the UK Economic and Social Research Council, the UK Medical Research Council, and the Wellcome Trust, which she chaired from 2020 to 2021. She has served in advisory roles to organizations, including the World Bank Technical Advisory Group on Investing for Resilient Health Systems (2021), and the Gates Foundation Technical Advisory Group on Exemplars in COVID-19 response (2020/23).

In 2025, Kruk left Harvard and joined Washington University School of Medicine as Distinguished Professor of Health Systems and Medicine and director of the University Wide QuEST Center.

== Research ==
Kruk has contributed to the field of public health by developing novel measures of health system quality and assessing how these systems' performance influences population demand for healthcare, health outcomes, and trust, using measures, implementation science and econometric methods to design and evaluate large-scale health system reforms.

In a highly cited study reporting the findings of the Lancet Global Health Commission on High Quality Health Systems, Kruk underscored the critical need for high-quality health systems in low- and middle-income countries (LMICs) to meet evolving health needs, proposing assessment criteria and systemic reforms. Her research also found that universal health coverage in low- and middle-income countries could prevent 8.6 million deaths annually if it includes high-quality care to address both non-utilization and poor-quality health services. Building on this research, she, along with Todd Lewis and colleagues, developed a survey to assess health system performance from the viewpoint of the population applicable to countries at all income levels. Results from this People's Voice Survey showed that fewer than 50% of people across 16 countries feel secure in their health systems.

In 2015, Kruk and collaborators proposed the first formal framework for resilient health systems. This drew from lessons from the Ebola epidemic, emphasizing the importance of effective response, maintenance of core functions, and post-crisis reorganization. Additionally, alongside Lynn P. Freedman, she proposed a framework for evaluating health system performance in developing countries, reviewing indicators across effectiveness, equity, and efficiency to assist policymakers in assessing the impact of various policies and expenditures.

Through the Lancet Commission on Investing in Health, Kruk and colleagues introduced a framework to achieve health gains by 2035, highlighting high returns on health investments, the potential for a "grand convergence" in health outcomes, fiscal policies to reduce non-communicable diseases, and progressive universalism for universal health coverage.

Another facet of Kruk's work focused on health system performance in maternal, neonatal, and child health. Analyzing basic maternal care quality in health facilities across five sub-Saharan African countries, she revealed lower scores in primary care facilities, which handle a significant portion of deliveries, and a consistent association between low delivery volume and poorer quality. Along with Sanam Roder-DeWan, she proposed service delivery redesign that would shift all deliveries to higher level health facilities for all women over time in low-income countries as a way to reduce persisting high rates of newborn mortality. In a survey conducted with colleagues in Tanzania, she demonstrated that 19-28% of women in Tanzanian health facilities experienced disrespectful or abusive treatment during childbirth, underscoring the urgency of solutions to ensure dignity and reduce maternal mortality. She further showed that disrespectful treatment during childbirth led to lower satisfaction, perceived poorer care quality, and reduced intention for future deliveries at the same facility, emphasizing the need for better interpersonal care in maternal health. She led papers for global research collaborations in maternal and child health, including the Lancet Maternal Health Series (2016) and the Lancet Child Health Series (2022).

== Personal life ==
She married Sandro Galea in New York in 2001. They have two children.

== Awards and honors ==
- 2010 – William J. McNerney Research Award, University of Michigan
- 2014 – Junior Faculty Teaching Award, Columbia University Mailman School of Public Health
- 2018 – Alice Hamilton Award, Harvard T.H. Chan School of Public Health
- 2018 – Canadian Women in Global Health List, Canadian Society for International Health
- 2021 – Marianne Wessling Resnick Memorial Mentoring Award, Harvard T.H. Chan School of Public Health

== Bibliography ==
=== Books ===
- Investing in Global Health Systems: Sustaining Gains, Transforming Lives (2014) ISBN 978-0309311694
- Essential Surgery: Disease Control Priorities, Third Edition (Volume 1) (2015) ISBN 978-1464803468

=== Selected articles ===
- Sachs, J., McArthur, J. W., Schmidt-Traub, G., Kruk, M., Bahadur, C., Faye, M., & McCord, G. (2004). Ending Africa's poverty trap. Brookings papers on economic activity, 2004(1), 117–240.
- Jamison, D. T., Summers, L. H., Alleyne, G., Arrow, K. J., Berkley, S., Binagwaho, A., ... & Yamey, G. (2013). Global health 2035: a world converging within a generation. The Lancet, 382(9908), 1898–1955.
- Countdown, N. C. D. (2018). NCD Countdown 2030: worldwide trends in non-communicable disease mortality and progress towards Sustainable Development Goal target 3.4. Lancet, 392(10152), 1072–1088.
- Kruk, M. E., Gage, A. D., Arsenault, C., Jordan, K., Leslie, H. H., Roder-DeWan, S., ... & Pate, M. (2018). High-quality health systems in the Sustainable Development Goals era: time for a revolution. The Lancet global health, 6(11), e1196-e1252.
- Kruk, M. E., Gage, A. D., Joseph, N. T., Danaei, G., García-Saisó, S., & Salomon, J. A. (2018). Mortality due to low-quality health systems in the universal health coverage era: a systematic analysis of amenable deaths in 137 countries. The Lancet, 392(10160), 2203–2212.
- Kruk, M. E., Kapoor, N. R., Lewis, T. P., Arsenault, C., Boutsikari, E. C., Breda, J., ... & Garcia-Elorrio, E. (2024). Population confidence in the health system in 15 countries: results from the first round of the People's Voice Survey. The Lancet Global Health, 12(1), e100-e111.
- Kruk, M.E., Sabwa, S., Lewis, T.P., Aniebo, I., Arsenault, C., Carai, S., Garcia, P.J., Garcia-Elorrio, E., Fink, G., Kassa, M., Mohan, S., Moshabela, M., Oh, J., Pate, M.A., Nzinga, J. (2024). Population assessment of health system performance in 16 countries. Bulletin of the World Health Organization, 102(7), 486–497.
