= John M. Corridan =

The Reverend Father John M. Corridan
- Born: John M. Corridan; June 6, 1911; New York City, U.S.
- Died: July 1, 1984 (aged 73); New York City, U.S.
- Resting place: Jesuit Cemetery, Auriesville, New York
- Occupation: Catholic priest

Reverend Fr. John M. Corridan (1911–1984) was a Jesuit priest who fought against corruption and organized crime on the New York City waterfront. He was the inspiration for the character of "Father Barry" in the classic film On the Waterfront.

== Biography ==
Son of a County Kerry-born policeman in New York's Harlem, Corridan graduated from Manhattan's Regis High School in 1928. Father Corridan was assigned to the Xavier Institute of Industrial Relations on Manhattan's West Side in 1946. He became a passionate advocate of reform in the International Longshoremen's Association waterfront union.

Father Corridan collaborated with Malcolm Johnson in Johnson's articles on waterfront corruption, which won Johnson a Pulitzer Prize. He was the subject of a 1955 biography, Waterfront Priest by Allen Raymond. The introduction of the book was by Budd Schulberg, screenwriter of On the Waterfront, who described how he met with Father Corridan frequently in researching the screenplay.

Schulberg described Father Corridan as a "tall, youthful, balding, energetic, ruddy-faced Irishman whose speech was a fascinating blend of Hell's Kitchen jargon, baseball slang, the facts and figures of a master in economics and the undeniable humanity of Christ."

Schulberg wrote that Father Corridan "led me to understand that there is nothing unusual about a Catholic priest's involving himself in moral issues that find practical form in the daily lives of his parishioners."

According to a 1983 article in the New York Times, Father Corridan's work was instrumental in formation of the New York-New Jersey Waterfront Commission aimed at curbing waterfront crime. Father Corridan, then retired, told a Times reporter that he believed that conditions on the waterfront had changed over the years.

The Times reported: "When he visited some former colleagues in Manhattan last year, he recalled, current conditions on the docks were barely discussed. 'I'm sure if anything of consequence were going on,' he said, 'somebody would have gotten in touch with me.'"

Father Corridan left the waterfront in 1957 to teach economics at Le Moyne College in Syracuse. He later taught theology at Saint Peter's College in Jersey City and served as a hospital chaplain in Brooklyn. Corridan died of a heart attack on July 1, 1984 at the Misericordia Medical Center in the Bronx. He was 73 years old and had lived in a health-care center at Fordham University.

== Sources and further reading ==
- Article in Company magazine, Summer 2003
- Raymond, Allen, Waterfront Priest (New York: Henry Holt and Company, 1955)
- Roberts, Sam, "Shaping Up the Waterfront Commission," The New York Times, Aug. 7, 1983
- The Priest Who Made Budd Schulberg Run: On the Waterfront and Jesuit Social Action, Inside Fordham Online, May 2003
- New York Times obituary, July 3, 1984
