= Karen Daley =

American nurse and administrator

- Occupations: Nurse and past president of the American Nurses Association
- Known for: Needlestick prevention advocacy

Karen Daley is an American nurse, past president of the American Nurses Association, former director of the American Nurses Credentialing Center and an advocate for the prevention of needlestick injury in healthcare. Daley, a former emergency room nurse, sits on the boards of trustees for several organizations.

== Biography ==
Daley was born and raised in Massachusetts. She worked as an emergency room nurse for many years until sustaining a needlestick injury on the job in 1998 while working at Brigham and Women's Hospital. Daley had drawn blood from a patient and when she disposed of the needle in a sharps container, she was stuck by another needle that was wedged in the container. A few months later, Daley tested positive for HIV and hepatitis C.

Daley encouraged the passage of a bill at the Massachusetts state legislature that required hospitals to report needlestick injuries to the Massachusetts Department of Public Health. For Daley's work in needlestick injury prevention, she was named a Fellow of the American Academy of Nursing in 2006. Daley has served as director of the American Nurses Credentialing Center and as president of the Massachusetts Association of Registered Nurses (MARN) and the Massachusetts Center for Nursing.

In 2010 and 2012, she was elected to two-year terms as president of the American Nurses Association, where she had previously served on the board of directors. She is on the board of trustees for the Dana Farber Cancer Institute, the American Nurses Foundation, The International Safety Center and the Barnstable Land Trust. In 2013, she was named to the Modern Healthcare Top 25 Women in Healthcare for 2013.

Daley holds a nursing diploma from Catherine Laboure School of Nursing and an undergraduate degree from Curry College. She earned master's degrees from Boston College and Boston University School of Public Health as well as a Ph.D. from Boston College. She has been awarded honorary doctorates from Rivier University and Curry College.
