= Boston University School of Public Health =

Graduate school at Boston University

Coordinates: 42.335588°N 71.070653°W

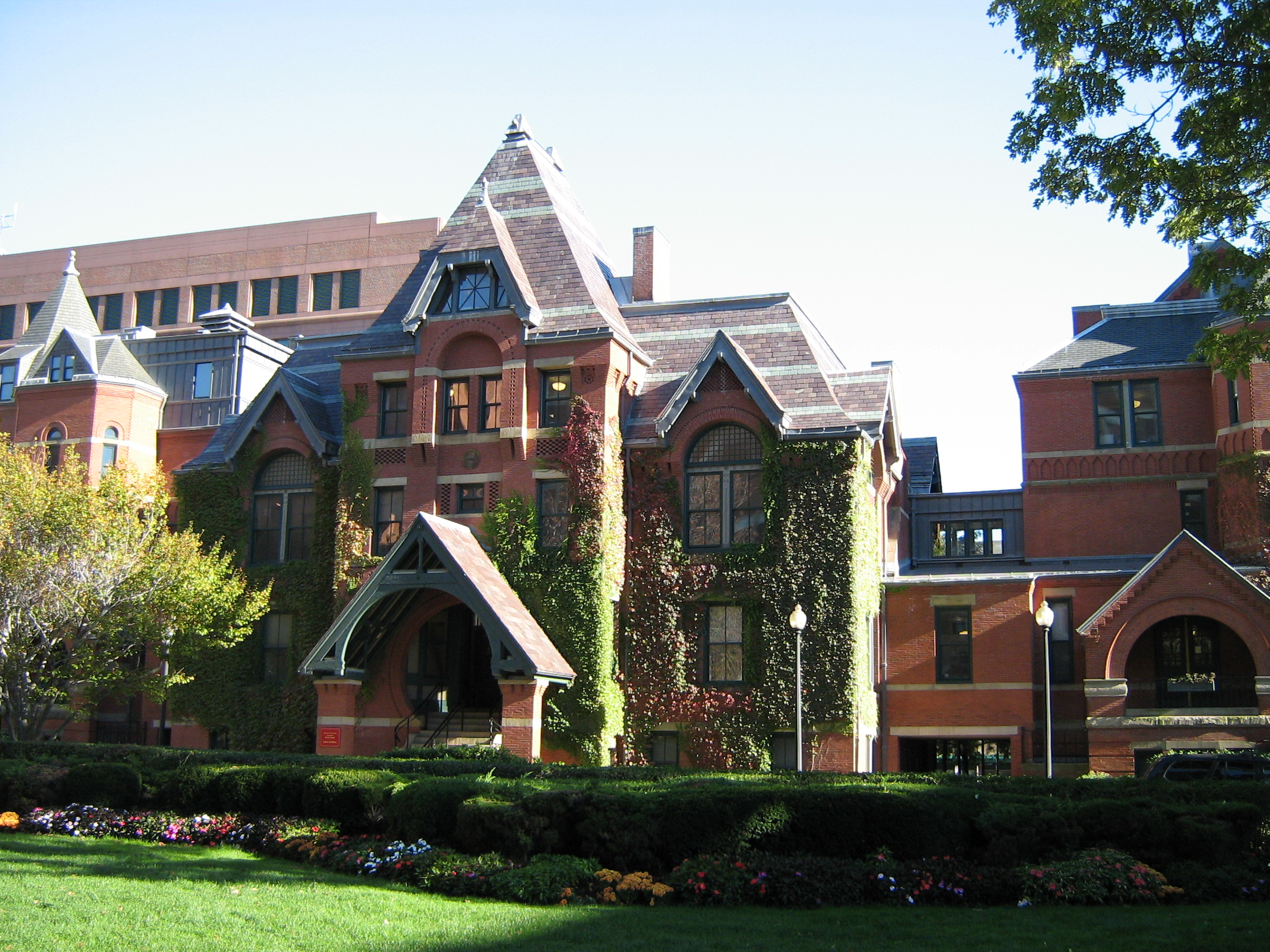
- The Talbot Building
- Type: Private
- Established: 1976
- Dean: Michael Stein
- Faculty: 303
- Students: 1,434
- Location: Boston, Massachusetts, United States
- Campus: Urban
- Website: bu.edu/sph

The Boston University School of Public Health (BUSPH) is one of the graduate schools of Boston University. Founded in 1976, the School offers master's- and doctoral-level programs in public health. It is located in the heart of Boston University's Medical Campus in the South End neighborhood of Boston, Massachusetts. The school has more than 8,900 alumni, 267 faculty, and 227 staff; its students hail from more than 43 countries, and its total research portfolio is worth more than $180 million.

The school is currently led by Dean Adnan Hyder who replaced interim Dean Michael Stein in August 2025.

== Mission ==
"The mission of the Boston University School of Public Health is to improve the health of local, national, and international populations—particularly the disadvantaged, underserved, and vulnerable—through excellence and innovation in education, research, and service."

== History ==
The school was established in 1976 as a program within the Department of Socio-Medical Sciences and Community Medicine with an initial class of 54 MPH students and 20 non-degree students. It was the brainchild of Dr. Douglas K. Decker, who designed its admission criteria (successful healthcare managers and practitioners), curriculum (practical, rather than theoretical), teaching approach (pairing academicians and accomplished practitioners in the field), and schedule (night classes only held on Tuesday, Wednesday, and Thursday so that working medical professionals could attend). The first dean was Dr. Norman A. Scotch, who guided the school through the accreditation process and who "developed a program that offered professionals the opportunity to continue working while they earned their degrees in Public Health."

In 1977, 59 part-time students were admitted to the MPH program. There were two concentrations: Health Delivery Systems and Health Research & Evaluation. Two new concentrations were added in 1978, Health Regulation & Planning and Public Health Law.

On June 26, 1979, BUSPH became an official school of Boston University, matriculating 156 students and offering afternoon courses for the first time. It had five programs: Environmental Health, Health Care Systems, Public Health Law, Research and Evaluation, and Social and Behavioral Sciences. That same year the first graduation ceremony was held for 46 graduates.

In 1981, the school expanded to include the departments of Epidemiology and Biostatistics. It also began accepting full-time students and enrolled its first international students. The International Health department was created the following year. In 1983, the School received its full accreditation by the Council on Education for Public Health.

The Office of Special Projects was established in 1985 to provide education and training in international health and to conduct overseas and domestic research and service programs. This Office later became the Center for International Health, which housed the Department of International Health. The following year, the first doctoral student graduated.

Robert Meenan assumed leadership of BUSPH in 1993. The school experienced significant growth during his 22 years as dean, matriculating 370 MPH students in 2012 and instituting a practicum requirement for MPH students.

In 2015 Sandro Galea, joined BUSPH as the schools dean. That same year, the school entered the top ten of USNews rankings for public health schools. In 2016, under the leadership of the Dean of Education, Lisa Sullivan, BUSPH introduced a new MPH program, featuring a core curriculum, interdisciplinary certificates, professional development, and practical education throughout the curriculum. Dean Sandro Galea stepped down at the end of 2024 after serving in the role for 10 years. Michael Stein was appointed interim dean and held the office until August 2025.

=== Talbot Building ===
The Talbot Building was designed by William Ralph Emerson in a Gothic Revival style and finished construction in 1876. Originally, the building housed the Massachusetts Homeopathic Hospital, acquiring its name from Israel Tinsdale Talbot, a physician that co-founded the hospital after being expelled from the Massachusetts Medical Society for proposing homeopathy classes at Boston University's medical school. From 1873 to 1899, Talbot concurrently served as dean of the medical school, overseeing its merger with the New England Female Medical College.

As the Massachusetts Homeopathic Hospital expanded its academic departments and research laboratories, it built new wings designed by Francis R. Allen and Herbert P. Kenway in 1891 to teach midwifery and nursing, resulting in the Talbot Building's unique "E" shape. Following the 1910 Flexner Report that derided homeopathy as ineffective pseudoscience, the hospital, which had now expanded to multiple neighboring buildings, was renamed to the Massachusetts Memorial Hospitals in 1929 and merged with the Boston University Medical Center in 1962. A 1996 merger with the Boston City Hospital formed the modern Boston Medical Center.

As hospital services were transferred to neighboring buildings of the South End neighborhood during the 1980s and 1990s, the Talbot Building fell into disrepair. When the Boston University School of Public Health tried moving the Environmental Health and Epidemiology departments into the third floor, it initially failed due to reports of mold, asbestos, and openings that allowed birds to enter the building. Following significant renovation in January 1998, overseen by Burt Hill Kosar Rittelmann Associates, BUSPH Dean Robert Meenan relocated all administrative offices of the public health program into the Talbot Building. The renovation replaced the original boiler room with a central lobby and created outdoor walkways between the building's wings.

== Granted Degrees ==
Boston University School of Public Health grants the following degrees:

- Master of Public Health (MPH)
- Master of Arts (MA)
- Master of Science (MS)
- Doctor of Philosophy (PhD)
- Doctor of Public Health (DPH)

=== Dual degrees ===
Dual degree programs are also available with other schools at Boston University. The dual degree typically allows the student to finish both degrees in less time than if the degrees were attempted separately. BUSPH offers dual degrees with the following schools:

- Boston University Graduate School of Management (MPH/MBA)
- Boston University School of Law (MPH/JD)
- Boston University School of Medicine (MD/MPH)
  - Division of Graduate Medical Sciences (MPH/MA)
- Boston University School of Social Work (MPH/MSW)
- Sargent College of Health and Rehabilitation Sciences (BS/MPH)
- College of Arts and Sciences (BA/MPH)

== Rankings ==
U.S. News & World Report ranks the Boston University School of Public Health 6th in the U.S. among public health graduate schools. The school received a rating of 4.2 out of 5 based on a survey of academics at peer institutions. According to Shanghai Ranking, Boston University is ranked among the top 20 best schools in the world in the field of public health.

== Research ==
Boston University School of Public Health's research portfolio is one of the largest at BU, the fourth largest research university in the country. Four broad areas of research focus represent the work of the school: urban living, gaining and well-being, health across the life-course, and health systems. Notable studies include:

- Framingham Heart Study, a long-term, ongoing cardiovascular study on residents of the town of Framingham, Massachusetts, which has been cited in over 1,000 medical papers since it began in 1948.
- Black Women's Health Study, funded by the National Institutes of Health, began in 1995 and follows a cohort of the 59,000 women who enrolled. The study focuses on the drivers of cancer and other diseases among African-American women.
- Drunk driving and alcohol policy studies for nationwide and state legislation on drunk driving laws.
- Research Advisory Committee on Gulf War Veterans’ Illnesses examining the underlying causes and potential treatments of gulf war syndrome.
- Gun violence studies, including a study linking state-level gun restrictions and violence, a study on how restrictive state gun policies lower young people's access to guns, and a study showing that states with higher estimated rates of gun ownership experienced a higher incidence of non-stranger firearms homicides.
- Obesity paradox study, showing that past research on obesity's link to mortality was flawed because the research used a one-time measure of an individual's weight rather than looking at weight changes over time.
- Substance use disorder studies showing that patients who use marijuana have lower odds of achieving abstinence from other drugs and alcohol, that recreational drug use on weekends often turns into more frequent use, and that benzodiazepines increase the risk of opioid overdose.
- New England Centenarian Study, one of the oldest such studies in the world, explores the reasons why some people reach very advanced ages and others do not, including genetics and lifestyle factors.
- Electronic cigarettes studies, making the initial determination that e-cigarettes are a less harmful alternative to smoking.

== Notable alumni and faculty ==
- Kathleen Carey, health economist and professor
- Elizabeth Cohen, MPH '92, CNN Medical Reporter
- Karen Daley MPH ’88, President, American Nurses Association
- Sarah Degnan Kambou MPH ’84, President, International Center for Research on Women
- Natalie Dell, MPH '08, US Olympic medalist
- Howard Koh, MPH '05 Former Massachusetts Commissioner of Public Health; United States Assistant Secretary for Health (U.S. Department of Health and Human Services)
- Ali Noorani MPH ’99, Executive Director, National Immigration Forum
- Gigi Tsereteli, MPH '05 Member of Parliament of Georgia
- Alexa Beiser, professor of biostatistics
