= Richard Morrow =

- Died: August 17, 2013; Baltimore, Maryland, US
- Education: Swarthmore College; Washington University School of Medicine; Harvard School of Public Health
- Spouse: Helga Magnus
- Children: 4
- Awards: Lifetime Achievement Award from the American Public Health Association
- Scientific career
- Workplaces: Johns Hopkins Bloomberg School of Public Health; Harvard School of Public Health; World Health Organization

Richard Harold Morrow Jr. was a professor at Johns Hopkins Bloomberg School of Public Health. and an international public health official. Morrow established public health programs in Ghana and Uganda, and worked for the World Health Organization.

== Early life ==
Morrow was born in Arlington Heights, Illinois. His father, Richard Morrow, was an inventor who sold vacuum cleaners of his own design, and a commercial paper bag opener for fast food restaurants. His mother, Mary Blyth Morrow, was a homemaker and had attended Sorbonne University in Paris.

== Career ==
He graduated from Swarthmore College in economics, and from Washington University School of Medicine with his M.D. He also earned a Master of Public Health from Harvard School of Public Health. After earning his medical degree, he did his residency at Strong Memorial Hospital in Rochester, N.Y. He also spent a year working in Many Farms, Arizona, treating members of the Navajo tribe, while he and his wife lived in a converted railroad car.

In 1962, he and his wife moved to Accra, Ghana to help establish a National Institute of Health. The Morrows then moved to Uganda, where his wife was a Peace Corps nurse, and he studied infectious diseases such as buruli ulcers.

From 1970 to 1976, Morrow was a professor of international health at the Harvard School of Public Health, before returning to Ghana for three years, and then to work for the World Health Organization in Geneva, Switzerland. From 1979 to 1991, he was the director of epidemiology and field research for the WHO's Tropical Disease Research and Training. In 1991, he joined the faculty of the Department of International Health at Johns Hopkins Bloomberg School of Public Health.

Morrow was responsible for the development of a system for measuring the burden of disease, which he published in a report in 1991. This was adopted by the World Health Organization, and the calculation of disability-adjusted life years is derived from this.

In 2006, he received the Lifetime Achievement Award from the American Public Health Association.

== Personal life ==
Marrow met his wife, Helga Magnus, while he was in medical school and she was in nursing school. They had four children. He died of pancreatic cancer on August 17, 2013, at his home in Baltimore.
