= Ali Noorani =

- Organization: Barr Foundation
- Title: Incoming President
- Website: www.barrfoundation.org

Ali Noorani (born 1974) is an American nonprofit leader who is the incoming president of the Barr Foundation. He was previously a Program Director at the William and Flora Hewlett Foundation, and the chief executive of two separate nonprofits focused on immigration policy.

== Biography ==
Noorani was born in California in 1974, the son of Pakistani immigrants. He completed a Bachelor of Arts degree at the University of California, Berkeley in 1996, and a master's degree in Public Health at Boston University in 1999. Noorani then served as the director of public health for the Dorchester House Multi-Service Center and Codman Square Health Center, two large community health centers in Boston, and worked for the City of Boston coordinating funding and technical assistance to regional environmental projects.

From 2003 until 2008, Noorani was Executive Director of the Massachusetts Immigrant and Refugee Advocacy Coalition

From 2008 to 2022, Noorani was the president and CEO of the National Immigration Forum, a Washington, D.C.- based immigration policy organization. Noorani led the Forum through a transition process to broaden its focus on unlikely allies and creative alliance building toward a better for future for immigrants and America. The National Immigration Forum has accreditation from the Better Business Bureau and a four-star rating from Charity Navigator.

== Professional activities ==
Noorani is a frequent voice on immigration policy and politics, and he has appeared on Fox News, CNN, MSNBC, NBC News, ABC News, and various radio and local news programs. He has been quoted in newspapers including the Wall Street Journal, New York Times and USA Today, and he speaks regularly on immigration at conferences and college campuses.

== Film ==
Noorani was featured in the 2009 documentary Papers – the movie. Papers is the story of undocumented youth and the challenges they face as they turn 18 without legal status.

He also appeared in Story 12 of How Democracy Works Now, a 12-part documentary film series that examines the American political system through the lens of immigration reform from 2001 to 2007. The series was directed and produced by award-winning filmmaking team Shari Robertson and Michael Camerini. A cut of the film premiered on HBO in March 2010, under the title The Senator's Bargain.

== Select publications ==
- There Goes the Neighborhood: How Communities Overcome Prejudice and Meet the Challenge of American Immigration, Prometheus Books (2017)
- “Conservatives Agree, Immigration Reform Can Be Good Policy and Good Politics,” Fox News Latino, October 17, 2012
- “Candidates, here's how to fix immigration,” CNN.com, August 27, 2012
- “Today, America welcomes young immigrants,” CNN.com, August 15, 2012
- “US Immigration System at its Worst,” Boston Globe, March 9, 2007
- “Race, Class, and the Emergence of an Immigrant Rights Movement in the United States,” The Fletcher Forum of World Affairs, Winter 2007 Vol 31:1
