= Environmental issues in New York =

Overview of the environmental issues in the U.S. state of New York

Area of New York

Environmental issues in New York State include water, waste disposal, hydraulic fracturing, air quality, and invasive species.

== Water ==
In New York State there are a multitude of water issues. In 2016 there was a harmful algal bloom (HAB). There are a multitude of bodies of water that are being affected by this for example, Chautauqua Lake was reported with HABs, as well as a high toxin report. In Cattaraugus County the Allegheny Reservoir was confirmed with algal blooms but no toxins. There are many more than 50 affected by HABs. In 1984, the State Acid Deposition Control Act required the reduction of SO_{2} emissions from existing sources and further NOx emission controls on new sources in New York State. Issues other causing and or helping the acid rain continue is power plants and automobiles. The environmental impact is eroding the ornamental facades, but it also messes with the sensitivity of an ecosystem like the Adirondack Mountains because the acid rains impacts the adequate soil buffering capacity to counter the acids deposited to it.

In 2016, high levels of PFOA were detected in the groundwater in and around Hoosick Falls, NY. A class-action lawsuit was filed against Saint-Gobain Performance Plastics Corp., which resulted in a $65.25 million preliminary settlement that will move to a federal judge for final approval. Per a consent order between New York State Department of Environmental Conservation (NYSDEC) and Saint-Gobain Performance Plastics and Honeywell International, the companies were also required to install a filtration system for the public water supply, an interceptor trench to prevent future contamination, and carry out a study to locate a long-term replacement water source.

== Waste disposal management ==
There are a multitude of different types of waste that is disposed in the state, some of them being household hazardous waste, construction and demolition debris, industrial/commercial waste, regulated medical waste, waste tires, used oil, and much more.

== High-volume hydraulic fracturing ==
High-volume hydraulic fracturing in New York State is no longer a problem but was earlier. Problems with this were contamination of drinking water. It polluted the air with tons of natural gas that was pumped from the ground. The drinking water at point was flammable when pedestrians and home owners would light their drinking water on fire. The smell of the gases impacted homeowners health very badly making some sick. But also it took up a lot of space and affected the living lifestyles of those that were near the sites where they pumped. Another impacted was habitat loss due to the large structures.

== Air quality ==
According to the American Lung Association's report State of the Air 2024, Queens County and Suffolk County received a grade of 'F' for ground-level ozone.

== Invasive species ==
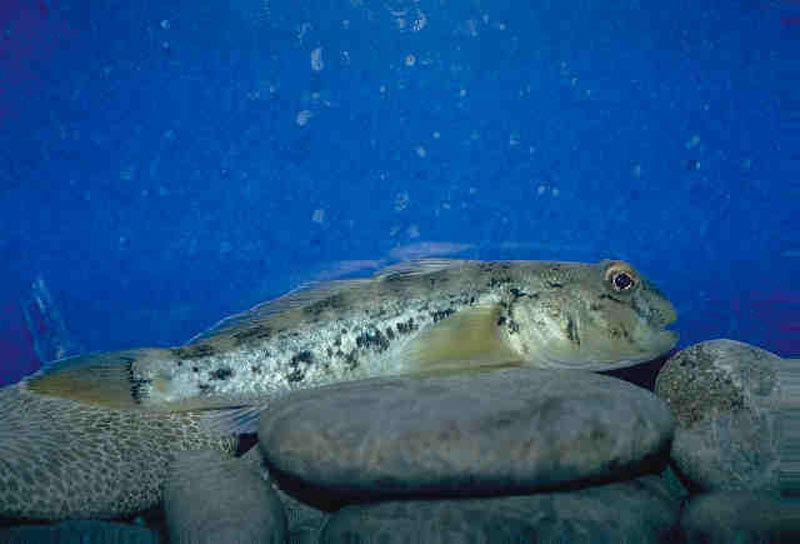
Here is an image of the goby that is an invasive species in New York State.

In New York State there are a multitude of different invasive species including the Asian carp, the zebra mussel, emerald ash borer, purple loosestrife, the goby, Spotted Lanternfly and more. An unfortunate byproduct of world travel and trade is the introduction of unwanted invasive species. Shipping pallets and crates, luggage, the ballast water of boats and even people can unintentionally transport invasive plants, insects and diseases to new areas. Without knowing that they would become problematic, some species have been introduced intentionally for use in landscaping, agriculture and other purposes. Invasive species impact all aspects of life, from recreation to livelihood. Spotted knapweed is an invasive plant that can take over crop fields, limiting crop production and feed for livestock. Hemlock woolly adelgid is an invasive insect that exfoliates and kills hemlock trees, a key species in maintaining important habitat along waterways.

== Environmental Regulatory Agencies in New York ==
=== New York State Department of Environmental Conservation (NYSDEC) ===
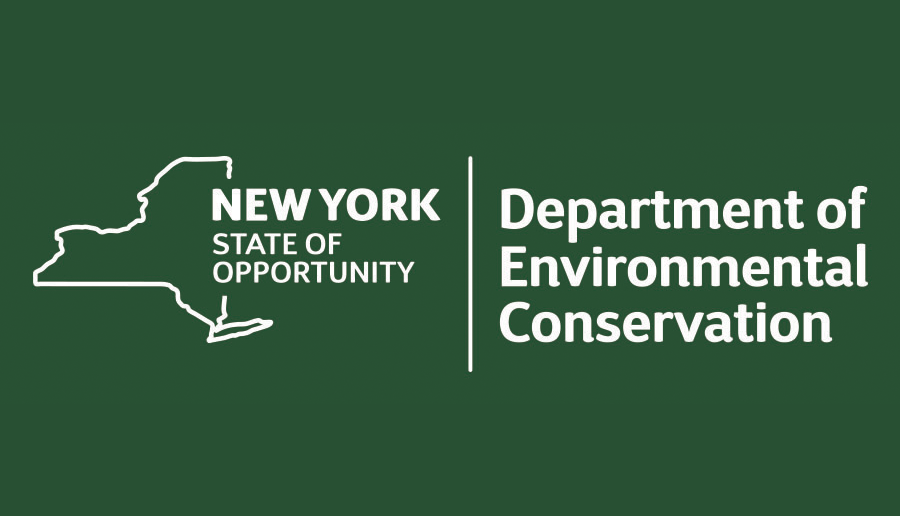
New York State DEC logo

The New York State Department of Environmental Conservation (NYSDEC) is the lead agency responsible for managing and protecting New York's natural resources and environment. Established in 1970 following the first Earth Day and the nationwide push for stronger environmental oversight, the NYSDEC enforces state environmental laws, oversees air and water quality standards, manages public lands and forests, and regulates activities such as hunting, fishing, and industrial emissions. The agency plays a key role in addressing climate change, reducing greenhouse gas emissions, and promoting sustainable resource use across the state.

NYSERDA logo

=== New York State Energy Research and Development Authority (NYSERDA) ===
The New York State Energy Research and Development Authority (NYSERDA) is a public-benefit corporation that promotes energy efficiency, renewable energy, and emissions reduction to support New York State's climate and energy goals. Established in 1975, NYSERDA designs and implements programs that advance clean energy innovation, provide incentives for energy-saving technologies, and support the transition to a low-carbon economy. It plays a central role in implementing the Climate Leadership and Community Protection Act (CLCPA), including goals for 100% zero-emission electricity by 2040 and net-zero emissions statewide by 2050.
