= Association for Safe International Road Travel =

The Association for Safe International Road Travel (usually abbreviated as ASIRT) is a non-profit, humanitarian organization that promotes road travel safety through education and advocacy. Rochelle Sobel, president and founder of ASIRT, created the organization in 1995, in response to her son Aron's death in a bus crash in Turkey. ASIRT helped found the US Congressional Caucus on Global Road Safety, and is an internationally influential and active organization. Working under the premise that road crashes are predictable and preventable, ASIRT serves the global community in a variety of ways to help reduce injuries and deaths and the associated social and economic impacts that result from them.

ASIRT serves as a resource to governments, corporations, travel organizations, guidebooks, study abroad programs, health/travel clinics and non-governmental organizations. ASIRT also helps to foster the development of new road safety organizations in other countries.

== Mission ==
The Association for Safe International Road Travel (ASIRT) is a non-profit organization that promotes global road safety through public education, policy advocacy, and the development of local road safety initiatives and partnerships.

== Organization ==
ASIRT's headquarters are in Potomac, Maryland; however, ASIRT works nationally, in the U.S., and globally through the United Nations Road Safety Collaboration (UNRSC), the Global Alliance of NGOs for Road Safety, and many other organizations.

=== Political achievements and goals ===
Working with Members of U.S. Congress: Alongside the Congressional Caucus on Global Road Safety, ASIRT works to increase awareness of U.S. legislators about the crisis in global road safety. This bi-partisan caucus has spearheaded the passing of many resolutions, including H. Con. Res. 87. This resolution solidified the United States' support for the United Nations' resolution for a World Remembrance Day for Road Crash Victims and their Families.

Working with Members of the U.S. State Department: ASIRT encourages State Department efforts on road safety by:

- Providing information to American travelers on the risks of road travel abroad through expanded road safety sections of Consular Information Sheets, and Embassy and State Department websites
- Collecting and disseminating road fatality statistics of U.S. citizens abroad by country and making information available on the U.S. State Department website.
- Facilitating the creation of partnerships between ASIRT and local organizations throughout the world, especially countries where the needs appear the greatest.

Working with the international community: ASIRT is a leader in the global road safety community, informing and cooperating with the World Health Organization (WHO), the U.N. and the World Bank.

- ASIRT-Kenya: ASIRT's first global chapter works to reduce fatalities and injuries among passengers of Matatus (local privately owned transportation vehicles) by offering driver training, emergency medical training for health professionals and child safety seat distribution. ASIRT-Kenya currently works to reduce speed around school zones thereby protecting the lives of children going to and from school.

=== Citizens traveling abroad ===
ASIRT provides road safety information to tourists, students and corporate travelers.

- Road Safety Reviews (RSRs): ASIRT's user-friendly reports on over 100 countries describing general road conditions; frequent road crash sites; national road safety statistics; driver behaviors; driving regulation; urban, rural, night, and seasonal travel precautions; pedestrian, passenger and cycle safety tips; quality and availability of emergency medical care, emergency procedures and contact information.
- A Global Road Safety Toolbox for the Study Abroad Community: a manual that helps study-abroad professionals to plan safe itineraries and students to make safe, informed travel choices while studying abroad.
- Training Seminars and webinars: ASIRT provides workshops and webinars that incorporate road safety education training, as well as student pre-departure campus and on-site orientations. Modules are tailored to the specific needs of the participants.

== Publications and media ==
Faces Behind the Figures:

A compilation of interviews of road crash victims and their families to memorialize and inspire road safety choices that save lives.

ASIRT on the Today Show

On July 6, 2007, ASIRT was featured on the Today Show
