= Black Women's Health Study =

The Black Women's Health Study (BWHS) is a long-term observational study conducted at Boston University's Slone Epidemiology Center since 1995 to investigate the health problems of black women over a long period, with the ultimate goal of improving their health. Gaining information about the causes of health problems that affect black women will help to determine health outcomes. The study, funded by the National Institutes of Health, follows a cohort of the 59,000 women that enrolled.

Black women are underrepresented in most studies of women's health, while some disorders are known to disproportionately affect black women. Women's health is often meant to reflect women's reproductive health, but in this case, it is better expressed as "the health of Black women". This study seeks to gather and compile information on the conditions that affect Black women including particularly breast cancer, lupus, premature birth, hypertension, colon cancer, diabetes, and uterine fibroids.

The study design is based on a biennial questionnaire. Publications have been released continually since the start of the survey, mostly dealing with specific conditions. The earliest were abstracts. The first comprehensive report was in 1998. Through May 2014, there have been a total of 205 papers. A biannual newsletter summarizing current work is also published.
