= Sandro Galea =

American epidemiologist

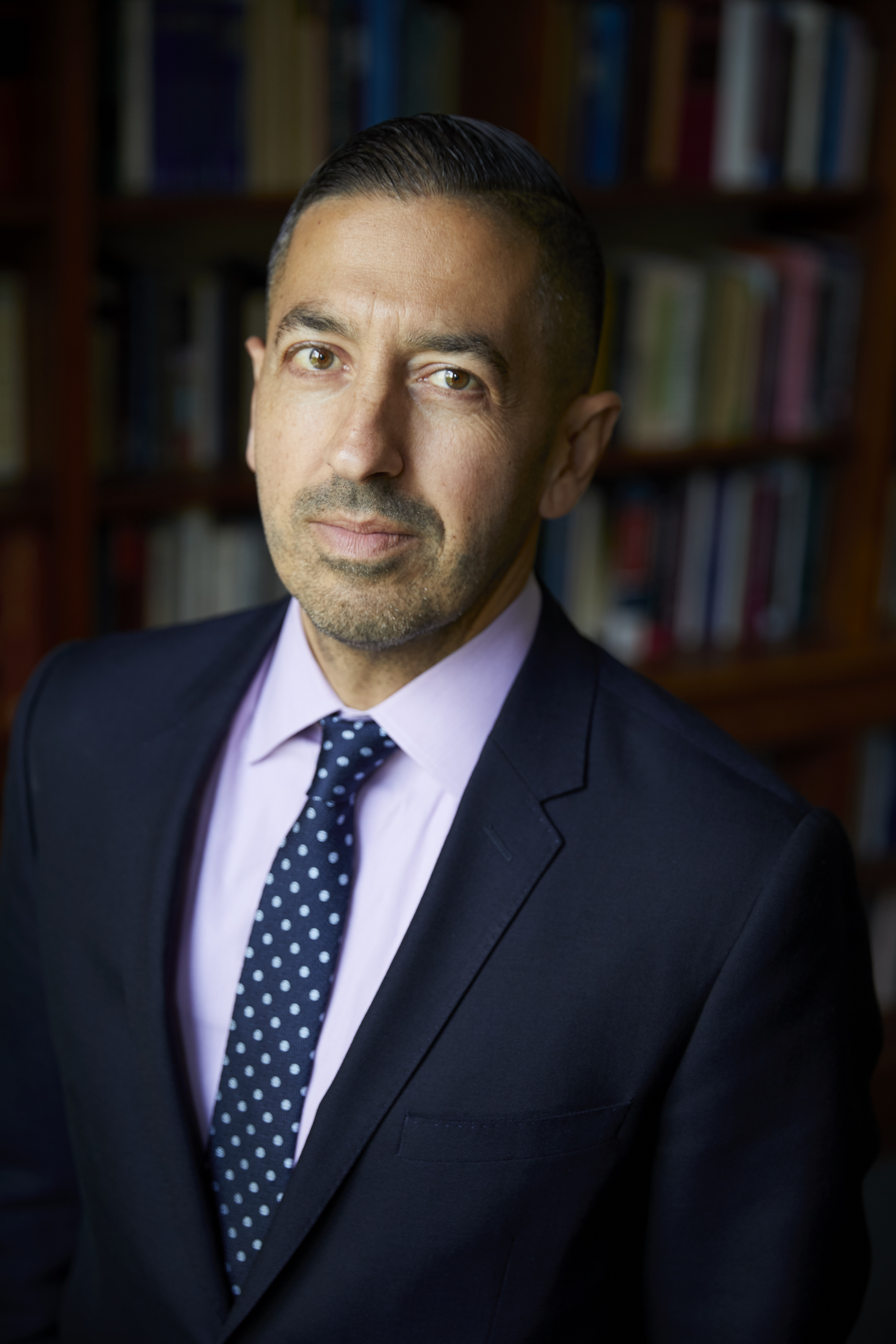
- Galea in 2018
- Born: April 24, 1971 (age 55); Republic of Malta
- Education: Columbia University; Harvard University; University of Toronto
- Spouse: Margaret Kruk
- Scientific career
- Fields: Epidemiology; Public health Emergency medicine
- Workplaces: Washington University in St. Louis; Boston University School of Public Health; Columbia University Mailman School of Public Health; University of Michigan School of Public Health; New York Academy of Medicine
- Website: www.sandrogalea.org

Sandro Galea (born April 24, 1971) is a physician, epidemiologist, and author. He is the inaugural Margaret C. Ryan Dean at the School of Public Health at Washington University in St. Louis.

Prior to joining Washington University in St. Louis, Galeo was dean of the Boston University School of Public Health, and the chair and Gelman Professor in the Department of Epidemiology at Columbia University.

He is an elected member of the National Academy of Medicine and has received awards for his research, including the Michael J McGinnis Award from the Interdisciplinary Association for Population Health Science, the Wade Hampton Frost and the Rema Lapouse Awards from the American Public Health Association, and the Robert S Laufer Award from the International Society for Traumatic Stress. Galea is most known for his research on social and psychiatric epidemiology. His work has focused on the social causes of health, mental health, and trauma. His peer-reviewed academic articles include publications in JAMA, the New England Journal of Medicine, and The Lancet. He has also edited and authored books including Well: What We Need to Talk About When We Talk About Health, The Contagion Next Time, and Healthier: Fifty Thoughts on the Foundations of Population Health. In 2025, he became editor of JAMA Health Forum, a health policy journal.

== Early life and education ==
Born on April 24, 1971, in Malta, Galea emigrated with his family to Canada at the age of 14. He completed his undergraduate studies in cell and molecular biology at University of Toronto in 1990. After graduating from University of Toronto Faculty of Medicine in 1994, he underwent residencies in family medicine at Northern Ontario School of Medicine University from 1994 to 1996 and emergency medicine at the University of Toronto from 1996 to 1997. While completing his family medicine residency in Thunder Bay, Ontario, he met his wife, Margaret Kruk, who is currently a professor at the Harvard T.H. Chan School of Public Health.

Early in his career, Galea worked as an emergency physician in Ontario district hospitals and as a project physician for Médecins Sans Frontières in Somalia. He then completed a Master of Public Health at the Harvard T.H. Chan School of Public Health in 2000, specializing in quantitative methods, followed by doctoral studies in Epidemiology at the Columbia University Mailman School of Public Health from 2000 to 2003.

== Career ==
Galea is an elected member of the National Academy of Medicine.

Galea worked as a medical epidemiologist at the New York Academy of Medicine's Center for Urban Epidemiologic Studies from 2000 to 2005 and was promoted to associate director in 2002. From 2003 to 2005, he also served as an assistant professor of clinical epidemiology at Columbia University Mailman School of Public Health. In 2005, he joined the University of Michigan School of Public Health as an associate professor in the Department of Epidemiology and was promoted to professor in 2008. From 2008 to 2009, he directed the Center for Global Health at the University of Michigan in Ann Arbor, and served as a board member and vice president of the International Society for Traumatic Stress Studies.

From 2010 to 2014, Galea was the chair and Gelman Professor in the Department of Epidemiology at Columbia University. He served as president of the Society for Epidemiologic Research from 2012 to 2013. In 2015, he became the dean of the Boston University School of Public Health and was appointed as the Robert A. Knox Professor in 2016. He was president of the Interdisciplinary Association for Population Health Science between 2017 and 2019. Between 2021 and 2024, he was a member of the Santé Publique France Scientific Board, served on the Board of Directors for Sharecare, and chaired the Board of Health for the Boston Public Health Commission between 2022 and 2024.

Galea has also served as an associate editor of the American Journal of Epidemiology from 2010 to 2024.

In 2025, he became the inaugural Margaret C. Ryan Dean of the School of Public Health at Washington University and the Eugene S. and Constance Kahn Distinguished Professor in Public Health. He was also appointed as the Editor-in-Chief of Jama Health Forum.

Galea writes and publishes the widely read Substack newsletter The Healthiest Goldfish.

== Research ==
Galea, through his research, has expanded the understanding of how social factors affect health, of common mood-anxiety disorders and substance use in populations, and of the population mental health consequences of conflict and mass trauma, including those related to firearms. In 2006, his research on the 2003 SARS outbreak among Toronto healthcare workers was profiled in Time. With over 1,000 peer-reviewed journal articles, his work has achieved an h-index of 161.

Galea's research has highlighted the link between specific social environment factors and the incidence, comorbidity, and progression of anxiety, mood, and substance use disorders. By applying novel analytic methods, he advanced classic psychiatric epidemiology, emphasizing the impact of social and economic forces on these disorders. His work also focused into the causes and effects of accidental drug overdose, leading to public health interventions aimed at reducing overdose-related morbidity and mortality in urban areas.

Galea developed a dynamic model of social and economic vulnerabilities to explain variations in population health and introduced innovative analytic methods to connect health outcomes with complex social processes.

Galea's work also documented the mental health sequelae of many of the largest human-made and natural disasters worldwide. His research established that the impact of mass traumatic events extends beyond the immediate victims to populations not directly exposed to the events. Additionally, he also conducted inquiry into the consequences of trauma and conflict on military service members and reservists worldwide.

== Awards and honors ==
- 2004 – Elected Fellow, New York Academy of Medicine
- 2006 – Health Policy Investigator Award, Robert Wood Johnson Foundation
- 2012 – Elected Member, National Academy of Medicine
- 2015 – Rema Lapouse Award, American Public Health Association
- 2015 – Honorary Doctorate, University of Glasgow
- 2016 – Robert S. Laufer Award, International Society for Traumatic Stress
- 2019 – Distinguished Service Award, Society for Epidemiologic Research
- 2024 – Honorary Doctorate, Icahn School of Medicine at Mount Sinai
- 2024 – Wade Hampton Frost Award, American Public Health Association

== Bibliography ==
=== Books ===
- Methods for Disaster Mental Health Research (2006) ISBN 9781593853105
- Macrosocial Determinants of Population Health (2007) ISBN 9780387708119
- A Life Course Approach to Mental Disorders (2013) ISBN 9780199657018
- Epidemiology Matters: A New Introduction to Methodological Foundations (2014) ISBN 9780199331246
- Population Health Science (2016) ISBN 9780190459376
- Systems Science and Population Health (2017) ISBN 9780190492397
- Healthier: Fifty Thoughts on the Foundations of Population Health (2017) ISBN 9780190662417
- Urban Health (2019) ISBN 9780190915841
- Well: What We Need To Talk About When We Talk About Health (2019) ISBN 9780190916831
- Pained: Uncomfortable Conversations about the Public's Health (2020) ISBN 9780197510384
- The Contagion Next Time (2021) ISBN 9780197576427
- The Commercial Determinants of Health (2022) ISBN 9780197578759
- Migration and Health (2022) ISBN 9780226822488
- Within Reason: A Liberal Public Health for an Illiberal Time (2023) ISBN 9780226822914
- The Turning Point (2024) ISBN 9780197749685

=== Selected articles ===
- Galea, S., Ahern, J., Resnick, H., Kilpatrick, D., Bucuvalas, M., Gold, J., & Vlahov, D. (2002). Psychological sequelae of the September 11 terrorist attacks in New York City. The New England Journal of Medicine, 346(13), 982-987.
- Hawryluck, L., Gold, W. L., Robinson, S., Pogorski, S., Galea, S., & Styra, R. (2004). SARS control and psychological effects of quarantine, Toronto, Canada. Emerging Infectious Diseases, 10(7), 1206.
- Galea, S., Nandi, A., & Vlahov, D. (2005). The epidemiology of post-traumatic stress disorder after disasters. Epidemiologic Reviews, 27(1), 78-91.
- Bonanno, G. A., Galea, S., Bucciarelli, A., & Vlahov, D. (2006). Psychological resilience after disaster: New York City in the aftermath of the September 11th terrorist attack. Psychological Science, 17(3), 181-186.
- Bonanno, G. A., Galea, S., Bucciarelli, A., & Vlahov, D. (2007). What predicts psychological resilience after disaster? The role of demographics, resources, and life stress. Journal of Consulting and Clinical Psychology, 75(5), 671.
- Galea, S., & Tracy, M. (2007). Participation rates in epidemiologic studies. Annals of Epidemiology, 17(9), 643-653.
- Ahern, J., Stuber, J., & Galea, S. (2007). Stigma, discrimination and the health of illicit drug users. Drug and Alcohol Dependence, 88(2-3), 188-196.
- Neria, Y., Nandi, A., & Galea, S. (2008). Post-traumatic stress disorder following disasters: a systematic review. Psychological Medicine, 38(4), 467-480.
- Kessler, R, Galea, S., Gruber, M. Sampson, Ursano, R., Wessely, S. (2008). Trends in mental illness and suicidality after Hurricane Katrina. Molecular Psychiatry 13 (4), 374-384
- Sherrieb, K., Norris, F. H., & Galea, S. (2010). Measuring capacities for community resilience. Social Indicators Research, 99, 227-247.
- Keyes, K. M., Cerdá, M., Brady, J. E., Havens, J. R., & Galea, S. (2014). Understanding the rural–urban differences in nonmedical prescription opioid use and abuse in the United States. American Journal of Public Health, 104(2), 52–59.
- Lowe, S. R., & Galea, S. (2017). The mental health consequences of mass shootings. Trauma, Violence, & Abuse, 18(1), 62–82.
- Weinberger, A. H., Gbedemah, M., Martinez, A. M., Nash, D., Galea, S., & Goodwin, R. D. (2018). Trends in depression prevalence in the USA from 2005 to 2015: Widening disparities in vulnerable groups. Psychological Medicine, 48(8), 1308–1315.
- Galea, S., Merchant, R. M., & Lurie, N. (2020). The mental health consequences of COVID-19 and physical distancing: the need for prevention and early intervention. JAMA Internal Medicine, 180(6), 817-818.
- Goodwin, R. D., Weinberger, A. H., Kim, J. H., Wu, M., & Galea, S. (2020). Trends in anxiety among adults in the United States, 2008–2018: Rapid increases among young adults. Journal of Psychiatric Research, 130, 441–446.
- Ettman, C. K., Abdalla, S. M., Cohen, G. H., Sampson, L., Vivier, P. M., & Galea, S. (2020). Prevalence of depression symptoms in US adults before and during the COVID-19 pandemic. JAMA Network Open, 3(9), e2019686-e2019686.
- Goodwin, R. D., Dierker, L. C., Wu, M., Galea, S., Hoven, C. W., & Weinberger, A. H. (2022). Trends in US depression prevalence from 2015 to 2020: The widening treatment gap. American Journal of Preventive Medicine, 63(5), 726–733.
- Leung, C. M. C., Ho, M. K., Bharwani, A. A., Cogo-Moreira, H., Wang, Y., Chow, M. S. C., ... & Galea, S. (2022). Mental disorders following COVID-19 and other epidemics: A systematic review and meta-analysis. Translational Psychiatry, 12(1), 205.
- Ettman, C.K., Hatton, C.R., Castrucci, B.C., Galea, S. (2025). Mental Health and Mental Health Care Utilization Across Political Affiliation in US Adults. Journal of Public Health Management & Practice 31 (1), 137-140
