= Thomas Augustine Hendrick =

American Catholic bishop

The Right Reverend Thomas Augustine Hendrick
- Bishop of Cebu
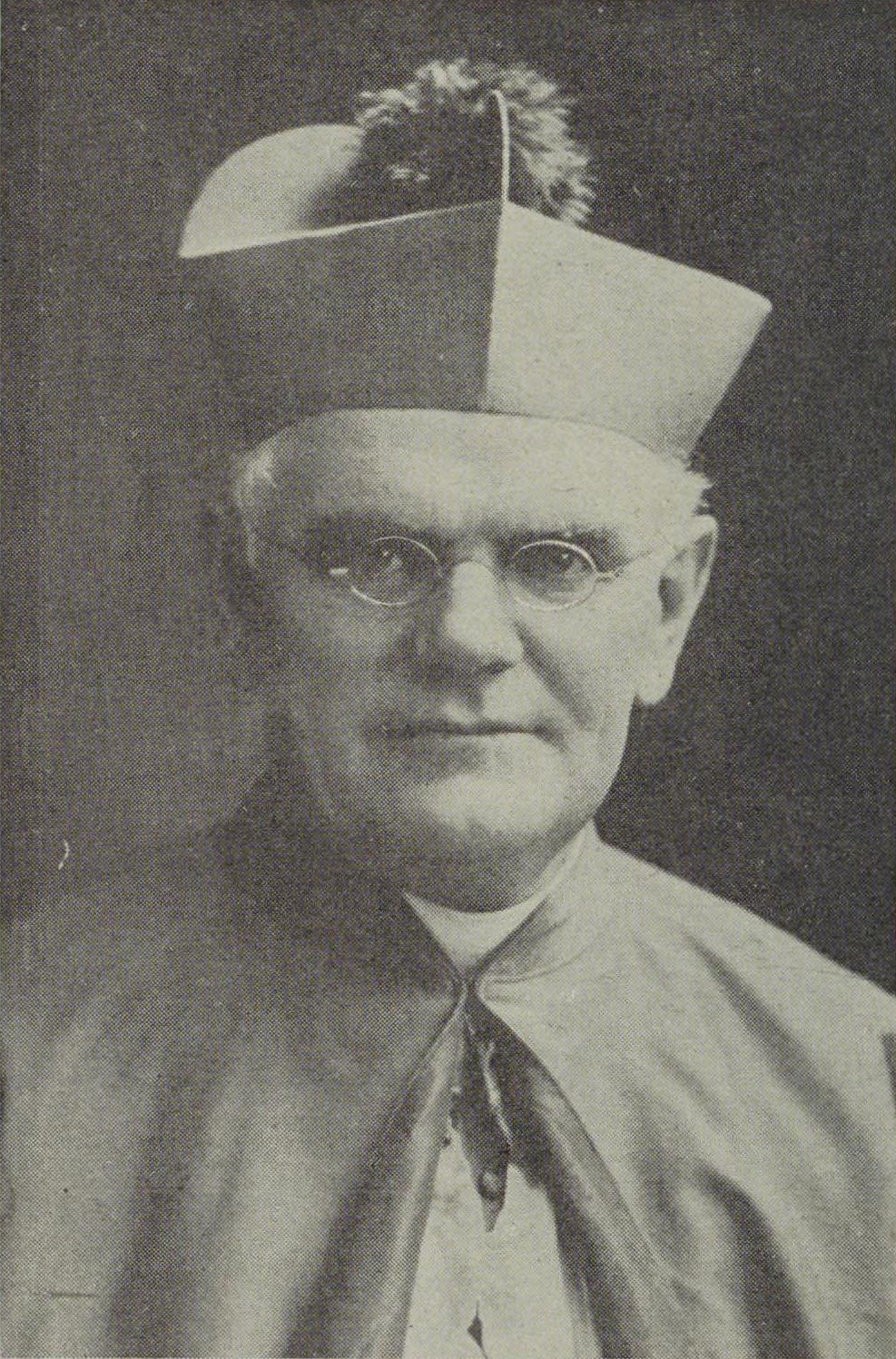
- Hendrick in 1905
- Church: Catholic Church
- Diocese: Cebu
- Appointed: August 18, 1903
- Term ended: November 29, 1909
- Predecessor: Martín García y Alcocer
- Successor: Juan Gorordo

Orders
- Ordination: June 7, 1873 by Edgar Wadhams
- Consecration: August 23, 1903 by Francesco Satolli

Personal details
- Born: October 29, 1849 Penn Yan, New York, U.S.
- Died: November 29, 1909 (aged 60) Cebu City, Philippines
- Motto: In nomine Jesu (Latin for 'In the name of Jesus')
- Coat of arms

Thomas Augustine Hendrick (October 29, 1849 – November 29, 1909) was an American prelate of the Catholic Church. Following the Philippine–American War, he served as Bishop of Cebu in the Philippines from 1903 until his death in 1909.

== Early life and education ==
Thomas Augustine Hendrick was born on October 29, 1849, in Penn Yan, New York. He was the son of Thomas and Catherine (née Corcoran) Hendrick, who were Irish immigrants. His mother's uncle was Michael Corcoran, the Bishop of Kildare and Leighlin (1815–1819). One of his brothers, Peter Aloysius Hendrick, served on the New York Supreme Court from 1906 to 1920.

In 1866, Hendrick entered St. John's College (now Fordham University) in New York City, where he studied for two years. He then attended Seton Hall College in South Orange, New Jersey, graduating in 1870. He completed his studies for the priesthood at St. Joseph's Seminary in Troy, New York.

== Priesthood ==
Hendrick was ordained a priest on June 7, 1873, by Bishop Edgar Wadhams in the chapel of St. Joseph's Seminary. He then served as an assistant pastor at St. Mary's Church in Rochester until 1874, when he became pastor of Holy Cross Church in Charlotte. From 1877 to 1891, he was pastor of St. Michael's Church in Union Springs, along with the missions of St. Patrick's in Aurora and St. Joseph's in Cayuga. He subsequently served as pastor of St. Bridget's Church in Rochester, where he remained until becoming a bishop in 1903.

In addition to his pastoral responsibilities, Hendrick was actively involved in philanthropic and political affairs. He was a supporter of the Republican Party and Theodore Roosevelt, then Governor of New York. Following the death of Father Sylvester Malone, he was elected to the Board of Regents of the University of the State of New York by the state legislature in 1900, serving until 1903. He was also a member of the New York Society for the Prevention of Cruelty to Children and the National Conference of Charities and Correction.

== Bishop of Cebu ==
=== Background ===
The annexation of the heavily Catholic Philippines by the United States and the rejection of Philippine independence by the 1898 Treaty of Paris helped fuel the Philippine–American War, during which the Catholic priest Gregorio Aglipay broke with the Holy See and founded the nationalist Philippine Independent Church. After the war ended with an American victory in 1902, Pope Leo XIII agreed to appoint American bishops to Philippine dioceses.

Hendrick's political ally Theodore Roosevelt, who had since become president of the United States, supported Hendricks for Archbishop of Manila, but this position instead went to Jeremiah James Harty. Writing to James Francis Smith, a member of the Philippine Commission, in July 1903, Roosevelt said:

I have known Father Hendrick a long time. He has always acted in an eminently just and reasonable manner in all my dealings with him and has won my sincere regard. I think you will find a valuable ally in the work of bettering the condition of the Filipinos.

=== Tenure ===
On August 18, 1903, Hendrick was appointed Bishop of Cebu by the newly elected Pope Pius X. Before accepting the position, Hendrick had met with Roosevelt at his residence in Oyster Bay, and obtained the president's promise to support the Catholic Church in the Philippines. Hendrick then traveled to Rome for his episcopal consecration. He was consecrated by Cardinal Francesco Satolli on August 23, 1903, with Jeremiah Harty (the newly consecrated Archbishop of Manila) and Archbishop Paolo Maria Barone serving as co-consecrators.

After a brief return to the United States, Hendrick arrived in Cebu City and took possession of the cathedral in March 1904. At the time, the diocese contained only 166 priests to serve a Catholic population of 1.7 million. War had left many Catholic institutions in a state of disrepair, and several church properties were under the control of Aglipay and his supporters. In a letter to Father John J. Wynne, Hendrick wrote:

The Catholics are prohibited, practically under pain of death, to go to Church, and also are forced to contribute to the Aglipayan cause which means simply the insurrectionary cause. The Governor of that province, Manuel Corrales, is a well educated and polished scoundrel...

It is equally dangerous to be a Catholic and a friend of the Americans. Many have been murdered for no other reason than these two. A bad Filipino is one of the worst savages on the face of the earth and even outdoes the horrid Apaches in America. They will bury the men alive, excepting the head which they will smear with sweetened water, leaving the ants to eat the man alive.

Within a month of his arrival, Hendrick wrote to Roosevelt to protest the political conditions in the Philippines, condemning "the honors that have been shown [to Aglipay] by prominent officials of the United States..." This perceived support for Aglipay led him to oppose William Howard Taft, then Governor-General of the Philippines, whom Hendrick described as "the wise man with his mouth, with a pusillanimous and dishonest heart." Hendrick's letter to Roosevelt soured their relationship, with the president replying in May 1904 that "The Government has shown, in a striking fashion, its friendliness to the people of the Islands and to the Church in which they believe." By January 1906, Hendrick declared, "I was promised by Mr. Roosevelt before I went to Rome [in August 1903] that the reception of the Government here would be cordial. This promise was not kept."

In 1907, Hendrick and the other American bishops in the Philippines submitted claims to the U.S. government totaling $2 million for wartime damage done to church property. Given the lack of developments on their claims, Hendrick traveled to Washington, D.C. in 1908 to support congressional legislation providing restitution to the Church. This legislation was supported by U.S. Representative Sereno E. Payne, chairman of the House Ways and Means Committee, who said, "I have known [Hendrick] for forty years...and no man was ever more devoted to his people or ever more honest in the discharge of [his] duties..." The congressional appropriation ultimately passed, but for only $450,000. Writing to Archbishop Harty, Hendrick subsequently said, "When I arrived in Washington, I found that the question was simply whether we would receive what Congress was willing to vote us or nothing at all. Of course I decided that we wish to get what we could, even though it might not be what we had a reason to expect."

== Later life and death ==
After obtaining the settlement from Congress, Hendrick traveled to Rome and had an audience with Pope Pius X, whom he asked for the appointment of an auxiliary bishop in Cebu. Father Juan Gorordo, a native Filipino, was consecrated as an auxiliary to Hendrick in June 1909.

After contracting cholera, Hendrick died on November 29, 1909, at the age of 60. He was buried on the same day at the Cebu Cathedral, while Bishop Dennis Joseph Dougherty celebrated a Requiem Mass the following day.

== Sources ==
- Heffernan, Bernard Leo (1925). Some Cross-Bearers of the Finger Lakes Region. Chicago: John Anderson Publishing Company.
- Zwierlein, Frederick James (1956). Theodore Roosevelt and Catholics, 1882-1919.
