= John Joseph Dunn =

American prelate

- Auxiliary Bishop of New York
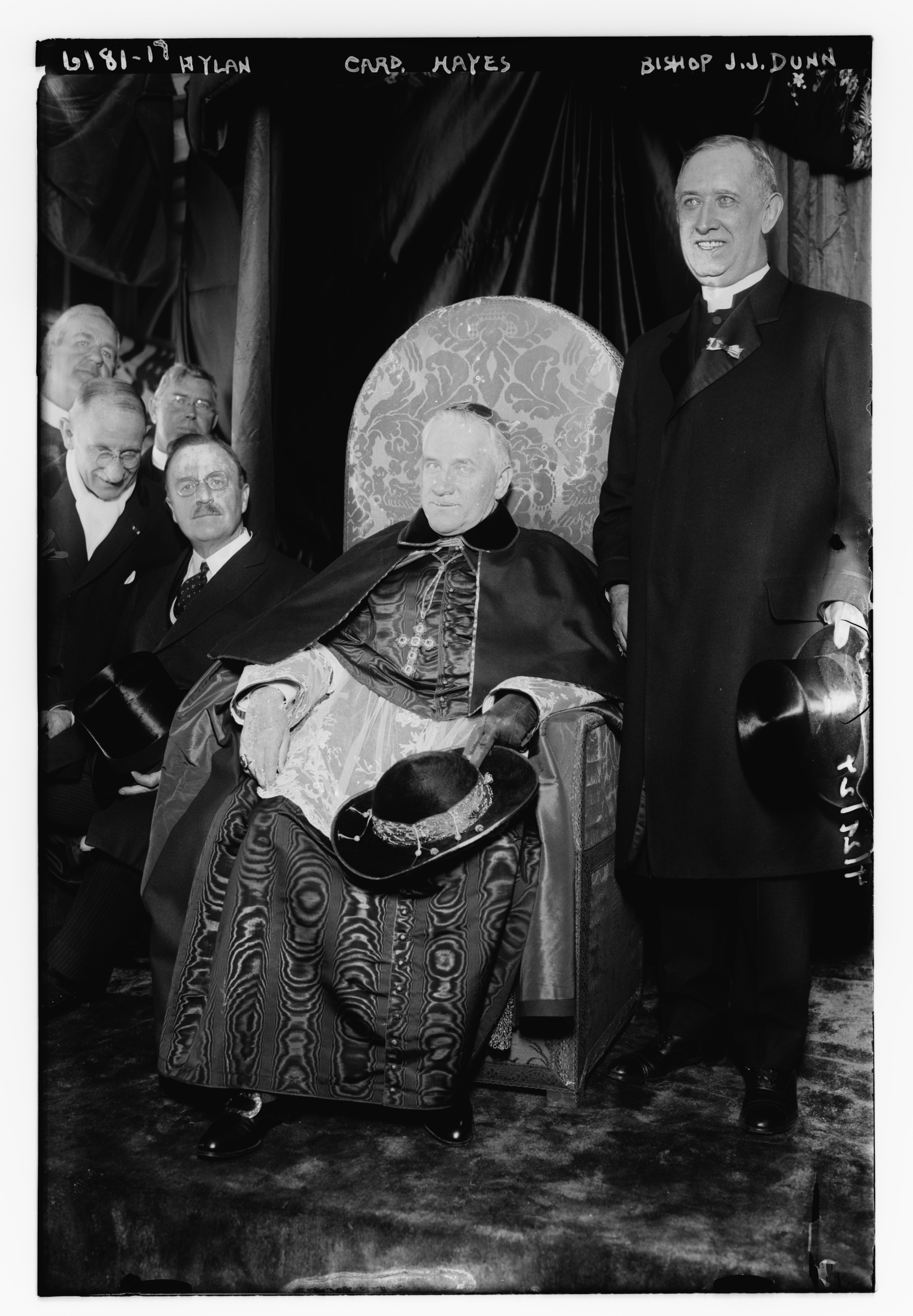
- Bishop Dunn (on right) in 1924
- In office: 1921-1933

Orders
- Ordination: May 30, 1896
- Consecration: October 28, 1922 by Archbishop Patrick Hayes

Personal details
- Born: September 1, 1870 New York City, U.S.
- Died: August 31, 1933 (aged 62) New York City, U.S.
- Buried: Cemetery of the Sisters of St. Dominic
- Denomination: Roman Catholic
- Parents: John and Mary (née Cassidy) Dunn
- Education: St. Francis Xavier's College
- Alma mater: St. Charles College
- Motto: Adoro Te Devote (Devotedly I adore Thee)

John Joseph Dunn (September 1, 1870 – August 31, 1933) was an American prelate of the Catholic Church. He served as an auxiliary bishop of the Archdiocese of New York from 1921 until his death in 1933.

== Biography ==
=== Early life ===
John Dunn was born on September 1, 1870, in New York City to John and Mary (née Cassidy) Dunn. He received his early education at the parochial school of St. Gabriel's Parish in Manhattan. He then attended high school at St. Francis Xavier's College in Manhattan.

After finishing high school, Dunn traveled to Ellicott City, Maryland to enroll at St. Charles College; he graduated there in 1890. Dunn then completed his theological studies at St. Joseph's Provincial Seminary in Troy, New York in 1896.

=== Priesthood ===
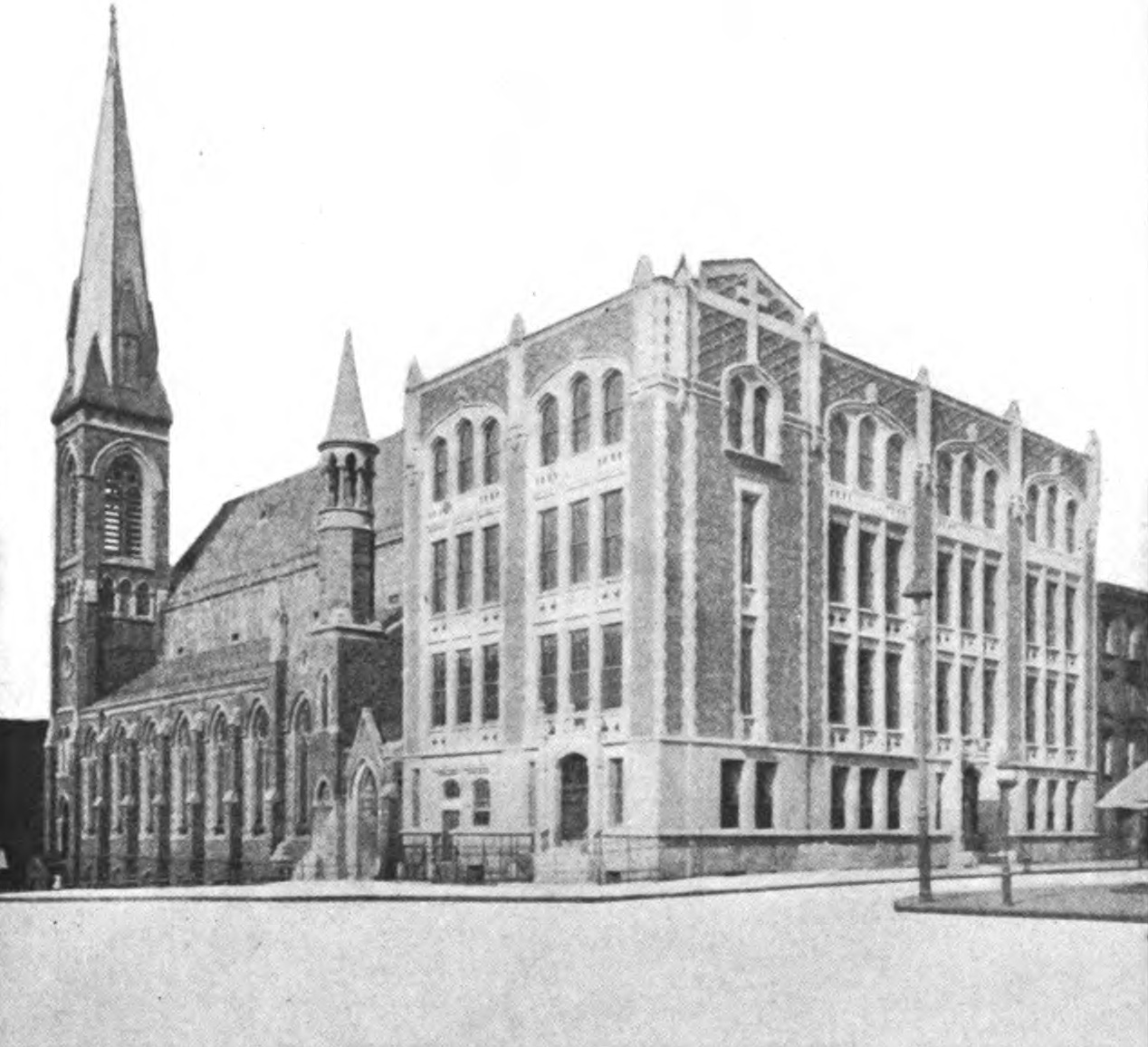
Saint John the Evangelist Church, New York City

Dunn was ordained to the priesthood for the Archdiocese of New York in Troy by Archbishop Michael Corrigan on May 30, 1896. After his 1896 ordination, the archdiocese assigned Dunn as a curate at St. John the Evangelist's Church in Manhattan.

In 1904, Dunn was named diocesan director of the Society for the Propagation of the Faith, a position which he retained until his death. During his first 17 years as director, he raised over $2 million for Catholic foreign missions. For 25 years, he wrote a column in the Catholic News, the archdiocesan newspaper, about these missions. Dunn was named chancellor of the archdiocese in 1914.

In the early 1900s, the City of New York started an investigation of Catholic Charities in the archdiocese that quickly devolved into a bitter dispute between them. It culminated in 1916 with investigators from the district attorney's office placing wiretaps on Dunn and other Catholic officials. He was ultimately charged with libel, obstruction of justice, and perjury based on information obtained through wiretaps. Dunn later testified before the Thompson Legislative Committee, tasked with the New York State Legislature with investigating the issue. The city eventually dropped all the charges against Dunn.

=== Auxiliary Bishop of New York ===
On August 19, 1921, Dunn was appointed auxiliary bishop of New York and titular bishop of Camuliana by Pope Benedict XV. He received his episcopal consecration on October 28, 1928, from Archbishop Patrick Hayes, with Bishops Joseph Conroy and John O'Connor serving as co-consecrators, at St. Patrick's Cathedral. Dunn selected as his episcopal motto: Adoro Te Devote (Latin: "Devotedly I Adore Thee"). During a dinner that same year, Hayes praised Dunn for his defense of the church during the 1916 investigation by the city.

In addition to his duties as director of the Society for the Propagation of the Faith, Dunn was named pastor of the Church of the Annunciation in Manhattan. He became treasurer of the archdiocese in 1922, and was named vice-president of Catholic Charities. He also served as chaplain of the New York chapter of the Knights of Columbus; spiritual director of the archdiocesan the Holy Name Societies; and grand prior of the American chapter of the Knights of the Holy Sepulchre, holding the rank of knight grand cross.

Dunn served as ecclesiastical superior of the Sisters of St. Dominic motherhouse in Newburgh, playing a role in their establishment of Greater Mount Saint Mary, a Catholic high school in that town.

=== Death and legacy ===
John Dunn died from a heart attack on August 31, 1933, at St. Vincent's Hospital in Manhattan at age 63. He is buried at the cemetery of the Sisters of St. Dominic in Newburgh.

Catholic Church titles
Preceded by –	Auxiliary Bishop of New York; 1921–1933	Succeeded by –
