= Thomas Emmet =

Thomas Emmet may refer to:

- Thomas Addis Emmet (1764–1827), Irish and American lawyer and politician
- Thomas Addis Emmet (bishop) (1873–1950), American-born bishop of the Catholic Church
- Thomas A. Emmet, one of the founders of the American Society of Civil Engineers
- Tom Emmett (1841–1904), English cricketer
