= Joseph Henry Conroy =

Catholic bishop (1858–1939)

His Excellency, The Most Reverend John Henry Conroy
- Bishop of Ogdensburg titular bishop of Arindela
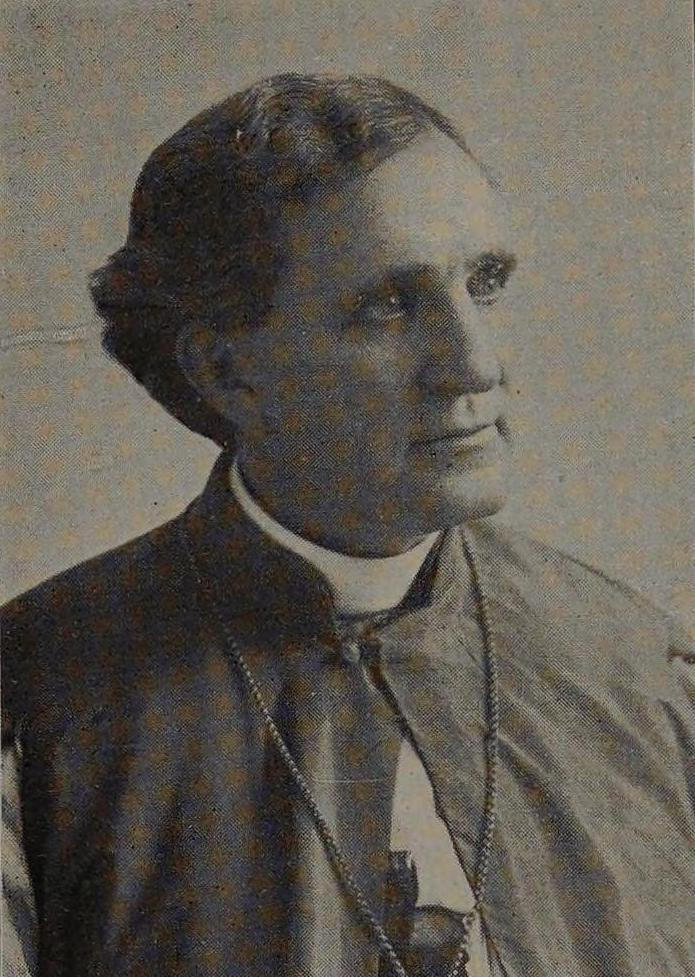
- See: Diocese of Ogdensburg
- In office: 1922 to 1939
- Predecessor: Henry Gabriels
- Successor: Francis Joseph Monaghan
- Other post: Auxiliary Bishop of Ogdensburg (1912 to 1921)

Orders
- Ordination: June 11, 1881 by Michael Augustine Corrigan
- Consecration: May 1, 1912 by John Farley

Personal details
- Born: November 8, 1858 Watertown, New York, US
- Died: March 20, 1939 (aged 80)
- Denomination: Roman Catholic
- Education: St. Michael's College; Grand Seminary of Montreal; St. Joseph's Seminary
- Motto: Dominus confortabit (The Lord will strengthen us)
- Coat of arms

Joseph Henry Conroy (November 8, 1858 – March 20, 1939) was an American prelate of the Roman Catholic Church. He served as bishop of the Diocese of Ogdensburg in New York State from 1921 until his death in 1939. He previously served as an auxiliary bishop for the same diocese from 1912 to 1921.

== Biography ==
=== Early life ===
Joseph Conroy was born on November 8, 1858, in Watertown, New York. He completed his preparatory studies for the priesthood at the Grand Seminary of Montreal in Montreal, Quebec, and at St. Michael's College in Toronto, Ontario. Returning to New York, he studied theology at St. Joseph's Seminary in Troy.

=== Priesthood ===
Conroy was ordained to the priesthood by Archbishop Michael Augustine Corrigan at St. Joseph's for the Diocese of Ogdensburg on June 11, 1881. After his ordination, the diocese assigned Conroy as an assistant pastor at the mission church at Churubusco, New York. He was later appointed pastor of a parish in Rouses Point, New York. In 1883, Bishop Edgar Wadhams named Conroy as rector of St. Mary's Cathedral in Ogdensburg, New York. Bishop Henry Gabriels appointed Conroy as vicar general of the diocese in 1901. The Vatican in 1905 elevated him to the rank of domestic prelate.

=== Auxiliary Bishop of Ogdensburg ===
On March 11, 1912, Conroy was appointed auxiliary bishop of Ogdensburg and titular bishop of Arindela by Pope Pius X. He received his episcopal consecration on May 1, 1912, from Cardinal John Farley, with Gabriels and Bishop Charles H. Colton serving as co-consecrators, at St. Mary's Cathedral.

=== Bishop of Ogdensburg ===
Following the death of Gabriels in April 1921, Conroy was named the third bishop of Ogdensburg by Pope Benedict XV on November 21, 1921. He was installed by Cardinal Patrick Hayes on January 18, 1922. In 1935, Gabriels allowed Reverend Cyril Stevens to become president of Ticonderoga National Bank in Ticonderoga, New York, despite canon law forbidding a priest to engage in business.

Joseph Conroy died on March 20, 1939, at age 80.

Catholic Church titles
Preceded by Henry Gabriels	Bishop of Ogdensburg; 1921–1939	Succeeded by Francis Joseph Monaghan
