= William O'Hare =

William O'Hare may refer to:

- William F. O'Hare, American-born bishop of the Catholic Church
- William H. O'Hare, American lawyer and politician from New York
