= Terry R. LaValley =

American Catholic prelate (born 1956)

His Excellency, The Most Reverend Terry Ronald LaValley
- Bishop of Ogdensburg
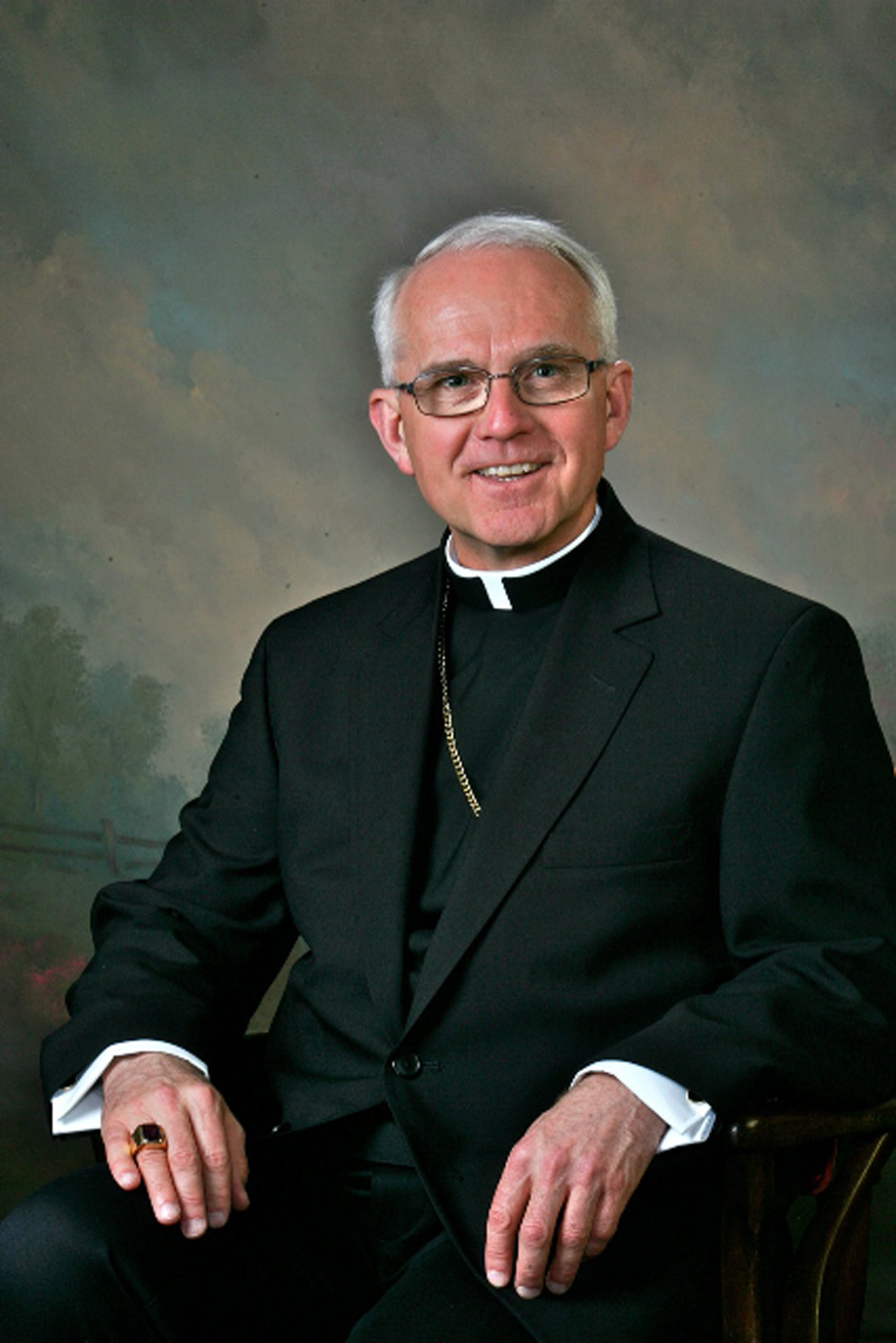
- LaValley in 2010
- Church: Catholic
- Diocese: Ogdensburg
- See: St. Mary's Cathedral
- Appointed: February 23, 2010
- Installed: April 30, 2010
- Predecessor: Robert Joseph Cunningham

Orders
- Ordination: September 24, 1988 by Stanislaus Joseph Brzana
- Consecration: April 30, 2010 by Timothy M. Dolan, Paul Loverde, and Robert Joseph Cunningham

Personal details
- Born: March 26, 1956 (age 70) Plattsburgh, New York, U.S.
- Education: State University of New York at Albany; Wadhams Hall Seminary-College; Christ the King Seminary; Saint Paul University
- Motto: Follow me

Styles of Terry Ronald LaValley
- Reference style: His Excellency; The Most Reverend
- Spoken style: Your Excellency
- Religious style: Bishop

Terry Ronald LaValley (born March 26, 1956) is an American Catholic prelate who serves as bishop of Ogdensburg in Northern New York. He is the first native of the Diocese of Ogdensburg to serve as its bishop since 1921.

== Biography ==
=== Early life and education ===
The second of six children, Terry Ronald LaValley was born on March 26, 1956, in Plattsburgh, New York, to Ronald (deceased) and Doris Gadway LaValley. He was raised in St. Ann's Parish and received his early education at Mooers Central School in Mooers, New York. LaValley graduated from Northeastern Clinton Central High School in Champlain, New York in 1974.

Following high school, Bishop LaValley attended the State University of New York at Plattsburgh for two years. In 1977, LaValley enlisted in the United States Navy as a Cryptologic technician, serving for six years. During that time, he earned a bachelor's degree from the State University of New York at Albany.

In 1983, LaValley entered Wadhams Hall Seminary-College in Ogdensburg, New York, earning a certificate in philosophy the following year. He continued his studies at Christ the King Seminary in East Aurora, New York. He received a Master of Divinity degree from Christ the King in 1988.

=== Ordination and ministry ===
LaValley was ordained to the diaconate on February 27, 1988 and then to the priesthood for the Diocese of Ogdensburg by Bishop Stanislaus J. Brzana on September 24, 1988 at St. Mary's Cathedral in Ogdensburg.

After his 1988 ordination, the diocese assigned him as parochial vicar at Sacred Heart Parish in Massena, New York. During his time at Sacred Heart, he also served as associate secretary of the diocesan marriage tribunal and a member of the presbyteral council. LaValley completed his graduate studies at Saint Paul University in Ottawa, Ontario, Canada where he earned a Licentiate of Canon Law degree in 1994.

Upon his return to New York, LaValley was named administrator of both St. Peter's Parish in Hammond, New York and St. Patrick's Mission Parish in Rossie, New York, as well as adjutant judicial vicar for the diocese. In 1996, LaValley became episcopal vicar for diocesan services and chancellor of the diocese. In addition to these responsibilities, he was appointed pastor of St. Raphael Parish in Heuvelton, New York (1998) and administrator of St. James Parish in Gouverneur, New York (1999). He returned to St. Raphael's in 2000, and became rector of St. Mary's Cathedral Parish in 2003.

In 2004, LaValley was relieved of his duties as episcopal vicar and chancellor, and named as Bishop Robert J. Cunningham's delegate to implement and oversee compliance with the Charter for the Protection of Children and Young People. On May 28, 2009, LaValley was elected the apostolic administrator of the diocese by the college of consultors, following Cunningham's installation as bishop of the Diocese of Syracuse.

=== Bishop of Ogdensburg, New York ===
On February 23, 2010, LaValley was appointed as the fourteenth bishop of Ogdensburg by Pope Benedict XVI. His episcopal consecration by Cardinal Timothy M. Dolan took place at St. Mary's Cathedral on April 30, 2010, with Bishops Paul Loverde, and Robert Cunningham acting as co-consecrators.

In May 2018, LaValley expressed his opposition to the New York Child Victims Act, which created a one-year window for adults to sue for sexual abuse crimes. Before the law was finally passed, LaValley started a compensation program for sexual abuse victims within the diocese. In an interview, LaValley made this comment about the scandal:

"The Church screwed up big time and people have been hurt immeasurably. How many times can I say I'm sorry for all that happened? What else can I do, I don't know."

== See also ==
- Catholic Church hierarchy
- Catholic Church in the United States
- Historical list of the Catholic bishops of the United States
- List of Catholic bishops of the United States
- Lists of patriarchs, archbishops, and bishops

Catholic Church titles
Preceded by Robert Joseph Cunningham	Bishop of Ogdensburg; 2010–present	Succeeded by Incumbent
