= Cardinal Hayes =

Cardinal Hayes may refer to:

- Patrick Joseph Hayes (1867–1938), fifth Archbishop of New York
- Cardinal Hayes High School, in the Bronx, New York City, named after Patrick Cardinal Hayes
