= John Murphy Farley =

Irish-American cardinal

His Eminence John Murphy Farley
- Cardinal Archbishop of New York
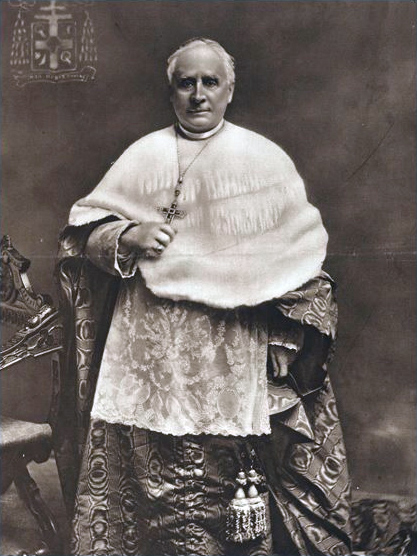
- See: New York
- Appointed: September 15, 1902
- Term ended: September 17, 1918
- Predecessor: Michael Corrigan
- Successor: Patrick Joseph Hayes
- Other post: Cardinal-Priest of S. Maria sopra Minerva
- Previous post: Auxiliary Bishop of New York (1895–1902)

Orders
- Ordination: June 11, 1870 by Costantino Patrizi Naro
- Consecration: December 21, 1895 by Michael Corrigan
- Created cardinal: November 27, 1911 by Pius X
- Rank: Cardinal-Priest

Personal details
- Born: April 20, 1842 Newtownhamilton, County Armagh, Ireland
- Died: September 17, 1918 (aged 76) Mamaroneck, New York, United States
- Buried: St. Patrick's Cathedral, New York
- Motto: Non nobis Domine (Not unto us, O Lord)

John Murphy Farley (April 20, 1842 – September 17, 1918) was an Irish-born prelate of the Catholic Church. He served as archbishop of New York from 1902 until his death in 1918, and became a cardinal in 1911. Farley previously served as an auxiliary bishop of New York from 1895 to 1902.

== Early life and education ==
John Farley was born in Newtownhamilton, County Armagh, Ireland, to Catherine (née Murphy) and Philip Farrelly. At age twelve, he was orphaned and went to live with his mother's family in the townland of Moyles. He received his early education under a private tutor named Hugh McGuire. He then attended St. Macartan's College in Monaghan from 1859 to 1864.

With the sponsorship of an uncle, Farley emigrated to the United States at the height of the American Civil War in 1864. He immediately enrolled at St. John's College in New York City, graduating in 1865. He then began his studies for the priesthood at St. Joseph's Provincial Seminary in Troy. In 1866, he was sent to continue his studies at the Pontifical North American College in Rome. He was present in Rome during the whole period of the First Vatican Council.

== Priesthood ==
Farley was ordained a priest for the Archdiocese of New York by Cardinal Costantino Patrizi Naro in Rome on June 11, 1870. After his ordination, the archdiocese assigned Farley first assignment as a curate at St. Peter's Parish in Staten Island, where he remained for two years.

in 1872 Archbishop John McCloskey, who had previously met Farley in Rome, appointed him as his secretary. It was around this time that he changed the spelling of his name from "Farrelly" to "Farley". Farley accompanied McCloskey to the 1878 papal conclave in Rome, but they arrived after the conclave elected Pope Leo XIII. Farley wrote the article on McCloskey for the Catholic Encyclopedia.

From 1884 to 1902, Farley served as pastor of St. Gabriel's Parish in Manhattan. During his tenure at St. Gabriel's, he eliminated the parish debt, oversaw the consecration of a new church, and built a parish hall. The Vatican elevated him to the rank of papal chamberlain in 1884 and of domestic prelate in 1892.

In addition to his pastoral duties at St. Gabriel's, Farley served as vicar general for the archdiocese from 1891 to 1902. He also served as president of the Catholic school board, in which position he organized a Catholic school parade in 1892. He later organized a Catholic school exhibit in 1894. The Vatican named Farley as a protonotary apostolic in 1895.

== Episcopal career ==
Styles of John Murphy Farley
- Reference style: His Eminence
- Spoken style: Your Eminence
- Religious style: Cardinal
- Posthumous style: none
- Informal style: Cardinal
- See: New York

=== Auxiliary Bishop of New York ===
Ordination history of John Murphy Farley
History
Episcopal consecration
- Consecrated by: Michael Corrigan (New York)
- Date: December 21, 1895
Episcopal succession
Bishops consecrated by John Murphy Farley as principal consecrator
- Charles H. Colton: August 24, 1903
- Thomas Cusack: April 25, 1904
- Thomas Francis Hickey: May 24, 1905
- John J. Collins, S.J.: October 28, 1907
- John Grimes: May 16, 1909
- Joseph Henry Conroy: May 1, 1912
- Patrick Joseph Hayes: September 8, 1892

On November 18, 1895, Farley was appointed auxiliary bishop of New York and titular bishop of Zeugma in Syria by Leo XIII. He received his episcopal consecration on the following December 21 from Archbishop Michael Corrigan, with Bishops Charles Edward McDonnell and Henry Gabriels serving as co-consecrators, at St. Patrick's Cathedral. Farley became Apostolic Administrator of the archdiocese upon the death of Archbishop Corrigan on May 5, 1902

=== Archbishop of New York ===
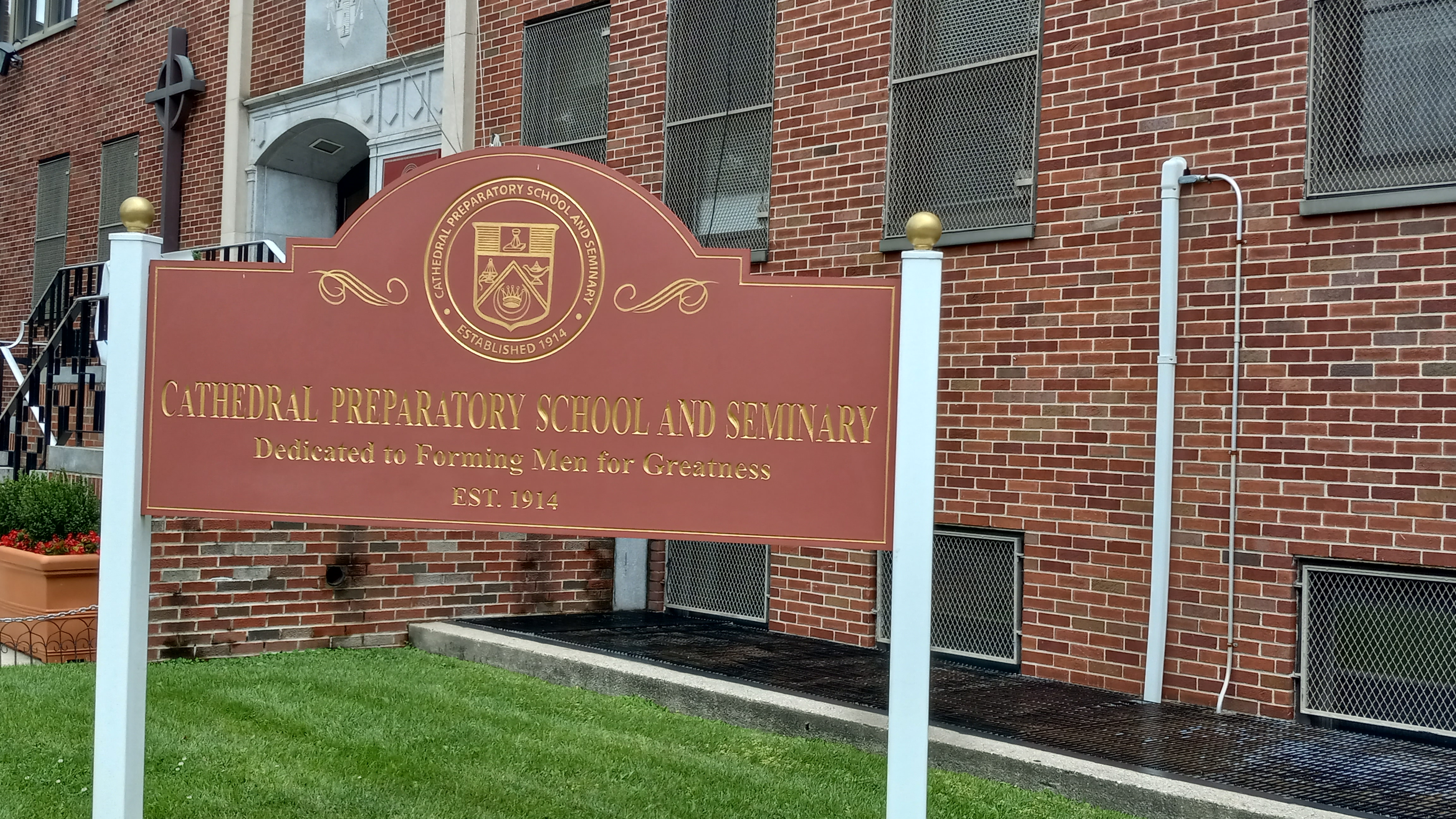
Cathedral Preparatory School and Seminary, Queens, New York (2024)

Farley was named as the fourth archbishop of New York on September 15, 1902. He was honored as an Assistant at the Pontifical Throne in 1905.

Pope Pius X created him Cardinal Priest of Santa Maria sopra Minerva in the consistory of November 27, 1911. He participated in the 1914 papal conclave that selected Pope Benedict XV. Following the outbreak of World War I in Europe, Farley stated,

As Catholics in America, we owe unswerving allegiance to the Government of America, and it is our sacred duty to answer with alacrity every demand our country makes upon our loyalty and devotion... I would that peace could come by arbitration and diplomacy. It seems, however, that no permanent peace can be hoped for except through the defeat of German arms in the field or the repudiation of the Prussian autocracy by the German people themselves. Criticism of the government irritates me. I consider it little short of treason.

Farley's dedication to victory in the war angered the Sinn Féin element of the New York clergy, who believed that he was bowing to anti-Irish bigots.

He made progress in Catholic education in the archdiocese the keynote of his tenure as archbishop, and established nearly 50 new parochial schools within his first eight years; he also founded the Cathedral Preparatory Seminary in Queens. Farley took daily walks with one of his priests down Madison or Fifth Avenues in Manhattan, noting, "A man never collects his thoughts so well as when he walks alone or with a congenial spirit."

=== Death ===
Farley died on September 17, 1918, in Mamaroneck, New York, at age 76. He is buried in the crypt under the altar of St. Patrick's Cathedral.

== Sources ==
- The Hierarchy of the Catholic Church Retrieved 2010-04-20.

Catholic Church titles
Preceded by Michael Corrigan	Archbishop of New York; 1902 – 1918	Succeeded by Patrick Joseph Hayes
