= Leo Richard Smith =

American Roman Catholic bishop

His Excellency. The Most Reverend Leo Richard Smith
- Bishop of Ogdensburg; Titular Bishop of Marida
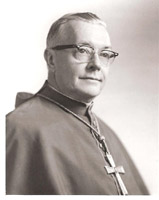
- See: Diocese of Ogdensburg
- In office: May to October 1963
- Predecessor: James Johnston Navagh
- Successor: Thomas Andrew Donnellan
- Other post: Auxiliary Bishop of Buffalo

Orders
- Ordination: December 21, 1929 by Basilio Pompili
- Consecration: September 24, 1953 by Amleto Giovanni Cicognani

Personal details
- Born: August 31, 1905 Attica, New York, U.S.
- Died: October 9, 1963 (aged 58) Rome, Italy
- Denomination: Roman Catholic
- Parents: Adam Henry and Mary Jane (née O'Neil) Smith
- Education: Canisius College; Pontifical University of St. Thomas Aquinas (Angelicum)
- Motto: Ne cesset mater manus tua (Don't let your hand rest, mother)
- Coat of arms

Leo Richard Smith (August 31, 1905 – October 9, 1963) was an American prelate of the Roman Catholic Church. He served as bishop of the Diocese of Ogdensburg in New York State for five months in 1963. He previously served as an auxiliary bishop of the Diocese of Buffalo in New York State from 1952 to 1963.

== Biography ==
=== Early life ===
Leo Smith was born on August 31, 1905, in Attica, New York to Adam Henry and Mary Jane (née O'Neil) Smith. He attended Canisius College in Buffalo, New York, where he obtained a Bachelor of Arts degree in 1926. He then furthered his studies in Rome, earning a Ph.D. from the Pontifical University of St. Thomas Aquinas in 1928 and a Doctor of Sacred Theology from the Urban College of Propaganda in 1930.

=== Priesthood ===
Smith was ordained to the priesthood for the Diocese of Buffalo by Cardinal Basilio Pompili on December 21, 1929 at the Archbasilica of St. John Lateran in Rome. He received a doctorate in canon and civil law from the University of St. Thomas Aquinas in 1932.

Following his return to New York, the diocese assigned Smith as a curate at St. Joseph's Cathedral Parish in Buffalo. In 1934, Bishop Joseph Henry Conroy named Smith as assistant chancellor of the diocese. He also served as diocesan director of the Confraternity of Christian Doctrine (1935-1941) and director of youth activities (1941-1946).The Vatican raised Smith to the rank of papal chamberlain in 1942 and domestic prelate in 1946. Bishop Bryan Joseph McEntegart named Smith as chancellor in 1946 and Bishop Walter Kellenberg appointed him as vicar general in 1953.

=== Auxiliary Bishop of Buffalo ===
On June 30, 1952, Smith was appointed titular bishop of Marida and auxiliary bishop of the Diocese of Buffalo by Pope Pius XII. He received his episcopal consecration at St. Joseph's Cathedral in Buffalo on September 24, 1952, from Archbishop Amleto Cicognani, with Bishops Raymond Kearney and James H. Griffiths serving as co-consecrators. He became episcopal moderator of the National Apostleship of the Sea in 1961.

=== Bishop of Ogdensburg ===
Following the transfer of Bishop James Navagh to the Diocese of Paterson, Smith was named eighth bishop of Ogdensburg by Pope John XXIII on May 13, 1963. Leo Smith died on October 9, 1963, in Rome while attending the Second Vatican Council at age 58

Catholic Church titles
Preceded by James Johnston Navagh	Bishop of Ogdensburg; 1963	Succeeded by Thomas Andrew Donnellan
Preceded by –	Auxiliary Bishop of Buffalo; 1952–1963	Succeeded by –
