= Stephen Joseph Donahue =

American bishop

His Excellency, The Most Reverend Stephen Joseph Donahue
- Auxiliary Bishop of New York
- In office: 1921-1933

Orders
- Ordination: May 22, 1918 by Basilio Pompili
- Consecration: May 1, 1934 by Patrick Hayes

Personal details
- Born: September 1, 1870 New York City, U.S.
- Died: August 17, 1982 (aged 88) New York City, U.S.
- Denomination: Roman Catholic
- Education: Pontifical North American College
- Motto: Monstra te esse matrem (Show thyself a mother)

Stephen Joseph Donahue (December 10, 1893 – August 17, 1982) was an American prelate of the Roman Catholic Church. He served as an auxiliary bishop of the Archdiocese of New York from 1934 to 1972.

== Biography ==
=== Early life ===
Stephen Donahue was born on December 10, 1893 in New York City, the fifth of ten children of Thomas P. and Dorothy (née Rentz) Donahue. His father was born in England to Irish parents, and his mother was born in Germany. He received his early education at the parochial school of Holy Name Parish in Manhattan run by the Christian Brothers. He was encouraged by one of his teachers to enter the priesthood.

After graduating from Holy Name School in 1906, he attended Cathedral College in Queens. He received the Cardinal's Medal for general excellence upon his graduation; the award was presented to him by the college's president, Father Patrick Joseph Hayes (who became archbishop of New York in 1919).Donahue entered St. Joseph's Seminary in Yonkers, New York, in 1912. A year later, he won a scholarship to the Pontifical North American College in Rome, where he studied for five years.

=== Priesthood ===
Donahue was ordained a priest for the Archdiocese of New York by Cardinal Basilio Pompili in Rome on May 22, 1918. After his ordination, the archdiocese assigned Donahue as an instructor of Sacred Scripture and Latin at Cathedral College, where he also served for a time as prefect of discipline. He also served as a curate at the Blessed Sacrament and at St. Gregory the Great Parishes, both in Manhattan. In 1920, Hayes appointed Donahue as his assistant secretary. He was advanced to secretary in 1922, and remained in that position until 1932, when he was appointed pastor of Holy Name Church, his boyhood parish. In his capacity as the cardinal's secretary, he traveled extensively with Hayes, including several trips to Rome. The Vatican elevated Donahue to the rank of monsignor in 1924.

=== Auxiliary Bishop of New York ===
On March 5, 1934, Donahue was appointed auxiliary bishop of New York and titular bishop of Medea by Pope Pius XI. He received his episcopal consecration on May 1, 1934 from Hayes, with Bishop Edward Mooney and Archbishop John Mitty serving as co-consecrators, at St. Patrick's Cathedral in Manhattan. Donahue selected as his episcopal motto: Monstra te esse matrem (Latin: "Show thyself a mother").

After his consecration, Donahue frequently represented Hayes at religious conventions and other events. When Cardinal Eugenio Pacelli, then-Vatican secretary of state and future Pope Pius XII, visited New York City in 1936, Donahue took a leading role in greeting him. Donahue also took a special interest in the National Legion of Decency, and served as a member of the motion picture committee of the National Catholic Welfare Council.

Donahue served as apostolic administrator of New York between the death of Hayes and the appointment of Bishop Francis Spellman, and celebrated a requiem mass for Hayes.

=== Retirement and legacy ===
After 38 years as an auxiliary bishop of New York, Donahue resigned his position on May 3, 1972. He died on August 17, 1982, at the Mary Manning Walsh Home in Manhattan, aged 88.
