= Diocese of Ogdensburg =

Latin Catholic ecclesiastical jurisdiction in New York, US

Diocese of Ogdensburg Dioecesis Ogdensburgensis

Catholic
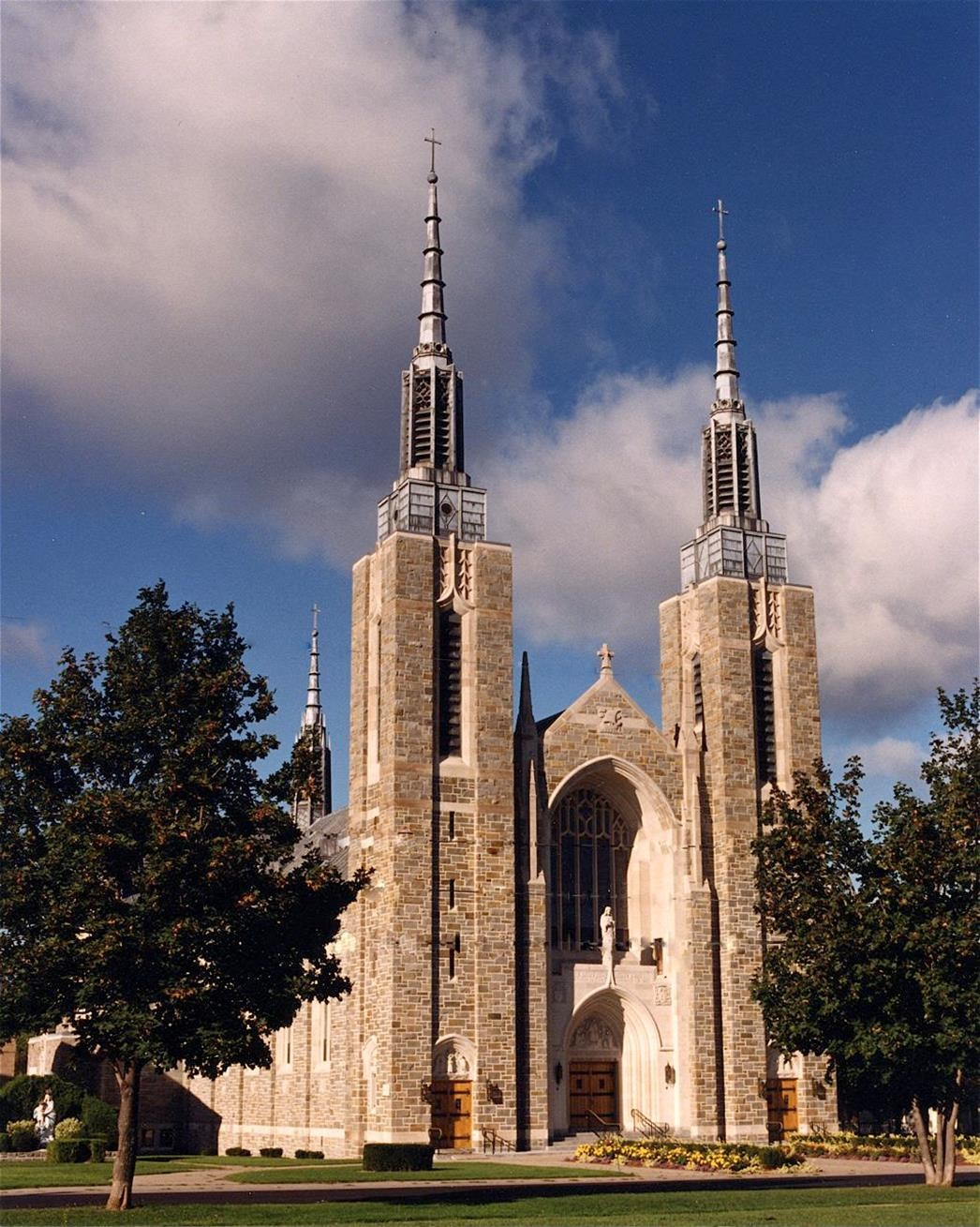
- St. Mary's Cathedral

- Coat of arms

Location
- Country: United States
- Territory: (New York (state)) Counties of St. Lawrence, Clinton, Essex, Franklin, Jefferson, Lewis, Hamilton and northern Herkimer, New York
- Ecclesiastical province: Archdiocese of New York
- Coordinates: 44°42′02″N 75°28′52″W

Statistics
- Area: 12,036 sq mi (31,170 km^{2})
- Population: Total; Catholics: (as of 2020); 421,694; 108,096 (25.6%)
- Parishes: 84

Information
- Denomination: Catholic
- Sui iuris church: Latin Church
- Rite: Roman Rite
- Established: February 16, 1872; 154 years ago
- Cathedral: St. Mary's Cathedral
- Patron saint: Our Lady of the Immaculate Conception

Current leadership
- Pope: Leo XIV
- Bishop: Terry Ronald LaValley
- Metropolitan Archbishop: Ronald Hicks

Map
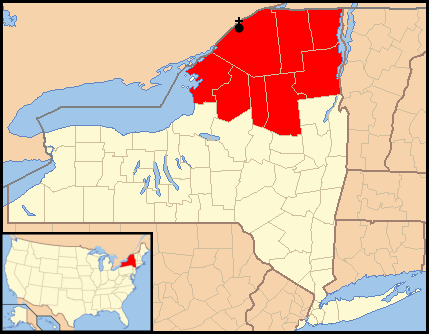

Website
- rcdony.org

The Diocese of Ogdensburg (Latin: Dioecesis Ogdensburgensis) is a diocese of the Catholic Church in the North Country region of New York State in the United States. It is a suffragan diocese of the Archdiocese of New York. Its cathedral is St. Mary's in Ogdensburg. Founded in 1872, it comprises the entirety of Clinton, Essex, Lewis, Hamilton and St. Lawrence counties and the northern portion of Herkimer county. The bishop is Terry R. LaValley.

== History ==
=== 1600 to 1777 ===
The North Country of New York was inhabited by the Iroquois/Haudenosaunee Native Americans when the first French, Dutch, and English fur-traders arrived in the 1600s. The few Catholics in the area were served by missionary priests from the Diocese of Quebec in the French colony of New France.

During the Dutch and British rule of the Province of New York in the 17th and 18th centuries, Catholics were banned from the colony. Richard Coote, the first colonial governor, passed a law at the end of the 17th century that mandated a life sentence to any Catholic priest. The penalty for harboring a Catholic was a £250 fine plus three days in the pillory. In 1763, Catholic Bishop Richard Challoner of London stated that "there is not much likelihood that Catholic priests will be permitted to enter these provinces."

However, much of the North Country was still disputed territory between France and Great Britain, allowing Catholics more freedom to reside there. In 1749, the Sulpician priest François Picquet traveled from Montreal to establish the Mission of The Holy Trinity at Fort de La Présentation near present-day Ogdensburg. The mission fort was established to evangelize the Haudenosaunee as well as to raid British settlements. Bishop Henri-Marie de Pontbriand of Quebec visited the fort in 1752. During the French and Indian War, Fort de la Présentation was garrisoned by French-Canadian military, but later abandoned in favor of Fort Lévis.

=== 1777 to 1808 ===
The New York Legislature passed a constitution in 1777 that guaranteed freedom of worship for Catholics. At this time, the state was technically under the jurisdiction of the Vicariate of London. In 1784, when the Apostolic Prefecture of United States of America was erected, it included all of the new United States. In 1789, this prefecture became the Diocese of Baltimore.

The first new settlers in the North Country were Protestants from New England. It was only towards 1790 that Acadian Catholic immigrants began settling around Corbeau, now Coopersville, near Lake Champlain. They were occasionally visited by French missionaries from Fort Laprairie in the British Province of Lower Canada.

=== 1808 to 1872 ===
In 1808, the Diocese of New York was erected. It covered all of New York State. In 1818, Jacques Leray, son of Count Jacques-Donatien Le Ray de Chaumont, established a colony of French and German Catholics in Jefferson County. Leray built several churches for the immigrants as well as for an existing Irish settlement. At the same time, Irish and French Canadian immigrants began to arrive, prompting the diocese to found missions for them.

By 1833, the Diocese of New York had established congregations in Ogdensburg, Carthage, and Plattsburgh. Each of them served a number of mission stations. The village of Minerva was served by J. Quinn, who travelled there from Troy, 100 miles away. The first Catholic church in Malone was constructed in 1837. In Watertown, the first Catholic church was opened in 1838.

In 1847, Pope Pius IX erected the Diocese of Albany, removing all of Upstate New York from the Diocese of New York. The establishment of mills and factories in the North Country attracted a large influx of Irish Catholic immigrants. The diocese then established new missions at Antwerp, Belleville, and Canton; and parishes at Cape Vincent, Hogansburg, and Keeseville. In 1860, Bishop John McCloskey of Albany placed the parish at Carthage under interdict for two years when violent confrontations erupted among the parishioners.

=== 1872 to 1939 ===
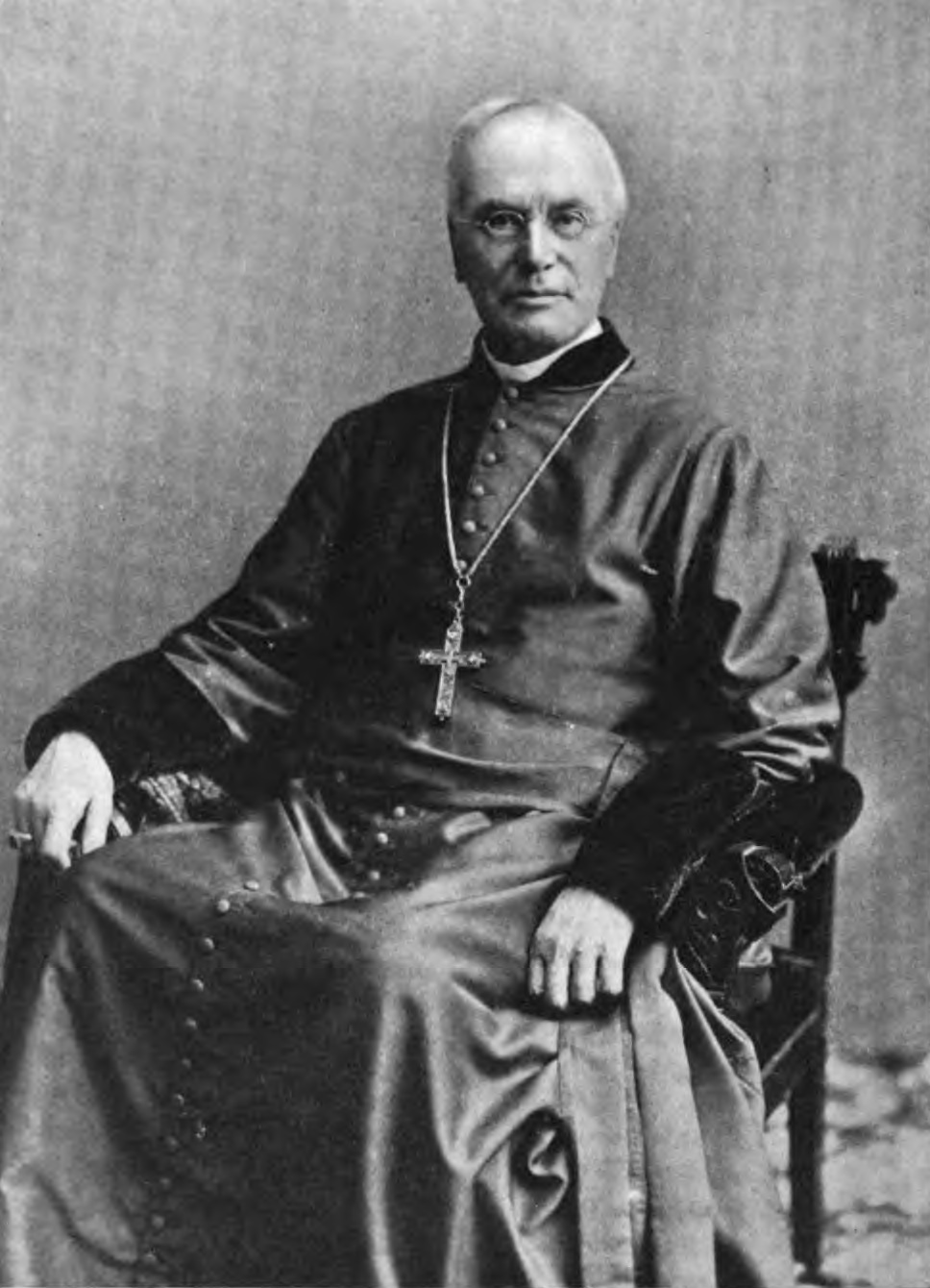
Bishop Wadhams (1914)

On February 16, 1872, Pius IX erected the Diocese of Ogdensburg, taking the entire North Country region from the Diocese of Albany. The Pope named Edgar Wadhams of Albany as the first bishop of the new diocese.

One of Wadham's first projects was to expand the small St. Mary's Church in Ogdensburg into a proper cathedral, adding a sacristy, stained glass windows, and a sanctuary. He also recruited priests from Quebec and Europe for the new congregations. He founded and improved schools in Carthage, Plattsburgh, Ogdensburg, Keeseville, Hogansburg and Brasher Falls. Wadhams invited several women's religious orders to the diocese, where they opened orphanages, schools, and hospitals. He held three diocesan synods. In 1885, Wadhams acquired a former mansion in Ogdensburg to create the Ogdensburg City Hospital and Orphans Asylum. He died in 1891.

The second bishop of Ogdensburg was Henry Gabriels of Albany, appointed by Pope Leo XIII in 1891. Gabriels was responsible for the growth and development of the Catholic Summer School at Cliff Haven near Plattsburgh, serving 10,000 people annually. In 1894, the Gabriels Sanitarium for tuberculosis patients opened in Gabriels, New York. Gabriels died in 1921. Auxiliary Bishop Joseph Conroy replaced Gabriels as bishop. In 1936, Monaghan was appointed coadjutor bishop of Ogdensburg.

=== 1939 to 1993 ===
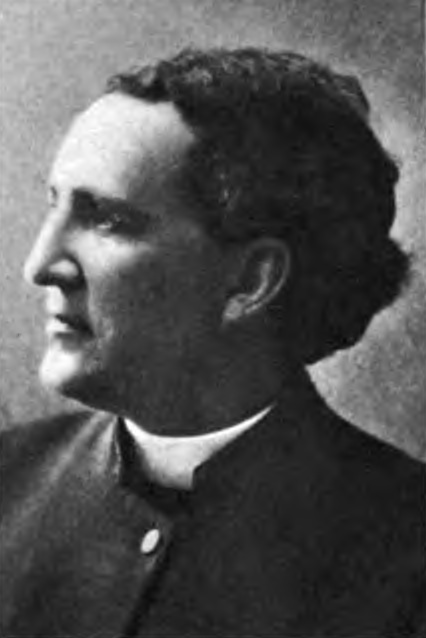
Bishop Conroy (1914)

Conroy served in Ogdensburg until his death in 1939. After he died, Monaghan succeeded him as the next bishop of Ogdensburg. Monaghan died three years later in an accident. Bryan McEntegart replaced Monaghan. Shortly after his installation, the Cathedral of Ogdensburg was destroyed by fire; McEntegart oversaw construction of a new edifice that was completed in less than a year. McEntegart resigned in 1953 and become rector of the Catholic University of America in Washington, D.C.

Pius XII appointed Auxiliary Bishop Walter P. Kellenberg as the next bishop of Ogdensburg. During his short tenure, Kellenberg expanded the diocese's Departments of Education and Catechetics and increased the number of parochial schools. Kellenberg was named by the same pope as the first bishop of the Diocese of Rockville Centre in 1957. Pius XII then selected Auxiliary Bishop James Navagh of the Diocese of Raleigh that same year to serve as bishop of Ogdensburg. He founded Mater Dei College in Ogdensburg in 1960.

In May 1963, Pope John XXIII selected Auxiliary Bishop Leo Smith of the Diocese of Buffalo as bishop of Ogdensburg. However, Smith died later that year. Pope Paul VI in 1964 then named Thomas Donnellan to replace Smith. Four years later in 1968, Donnellan transferred to the Archdiocese of Atlanta.

Auxiliary Bishop Stanislaus Brzana of Buffalo was the next bishop of Ogdensburg, as of 1968. He established several churches and education centers, and was active in regional civic and social activities, including caring for striking miners and their families. Brzana served 25 years as bishop in Ogdensburg, retiring in 1993.

In December 1985, John J. Fallon, pastor of Holy Angels Parish in Altona, pleaded guilty to mailing child pornography and was sentenced to five years probation along with inpatient treatment. In 1988, the diocese placed him as chaplain at St. Joseph's Home in Ogdensburg. In a July 2020 lawsuit against the diocese, four men accused Fallon of sexually abusing them during the 1970s and 1980s at three parishes in the diocese.

=== 1993 to present ===
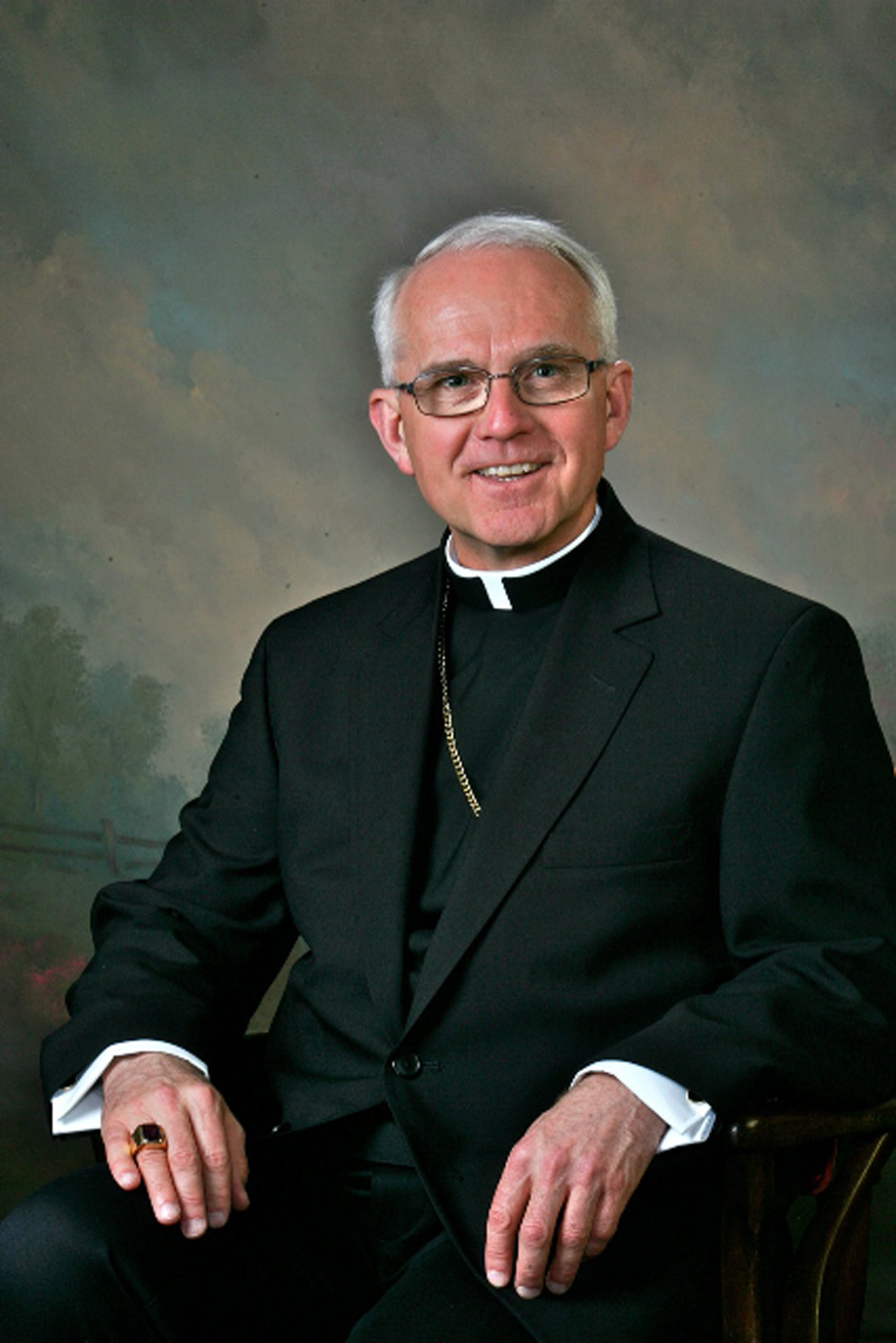
Bishop Lavalley (2024)

In 1993, Pope John Paul II appointed Auxiliary Bishop Paul Loverde of the Archdiocese of Hartford as the eleventh bishop of Ogdensburg. In 1999, he closed Mater Dei College. Loverde in 1998 was named by John Paul II as bishop of the Diocese of Arlington.

John Paul II replaced Loverde in Ogdensburg with Auxiliary Bishop Gerald Barbarito of the Diocese of Brooklyn that same year. In 2003, Barbarito was transferred to the Diocese of Palm Beach. The next bishop of Ogdensburg was Robert J. Cunningham, named in 2004. He became the bishop of the Diocese of Syracuse in 2004.

In May 2018, Bishop LaValley expressed his opposition to the proposed New York Child Victims Act, which created a one-year window for adults to sue for sexual abuse crimes. That same year, LaValley started a compensation program for sexual misconduct victims within the diocese. In an interview, the bishop stated the following: "The Church screwed up big time and people have been hurt immeasurably." By the time that the Child Victims Act had passed in February 2019, the diocese had already paid nearly $5.5 million to settle previous lawsuits. Twenty-three more lawsuits were filed immediately after the bill's signing, and two law firms announced they had filed 20 additional lawsuits against the diocese by July 2020. In July 2023, the diocese stated that it could no longer afford to pay settlements and filed for Chapter 11 bankruptcy reorganization in the U.S. Bankruptcy Court in Utica.

The current bishop of Ogdensburg, the 14th bishop since 1872, is Terry R. LaValley, named by Benedict XVI in 2010.

== Bishops ==
=== Bishops of Ogdensburg ===
1. Edgar Philip Prindle Wadhams (1872–1891)
2. Henry Gabriels (1892–1921), former rector of St Joseph's Seminary in Troy, New York
3. Joseph Henry Conroy (1921–1939)
4. Francis Joseph Monaghan (1939–1942; coadjutor bishop 1936–1939)
5. Bryan Joseph McEntegart (1943–1953), appointed rector of The Catholic University of America and later Bishop of Brooklyn and Archbishop (ad personam)
6. Walter P. Kellenberg (1954–1957), appointed in 1957 Bishop of Rockville Centre
7. James Johnston Navagh (1957–1963), appointed Bishop of Paterson
8. Leo Richard Smith (1963)
9. Thomas Andrew Donnellan (1964–1968), appointed Archbishop of Atlanta
10. Stanislaus Joseph Brzana (1968–1994)
11. Paul Stephen Loverde (1994–1999), appointed Bishop of Arlington
12. Gerald Michael Barbarito (2000–2003), appointed Bishop of Palm Beach
13. Robert Joseph Cunningham (2004–2009), appointed Bishop of Syracuse
14. Terry R. LaValley (2010–present)

=== Former auxiliary bishop ===
- Joseph Henry Conroy (1912–1921), appointed bishop of Ogdensburg

=== Other diocesan priest who became bishop ===
- Douglas John Lucia, appointed Bishop of Syracuse in 2019

== High schools ==
- Immaculate Heart Central High School, Watertown
- Seton Catholic Central High School, Plattsburgh
