= Francis Joseph Monaghan =

American Catholic bishop (1890–1942)

His Excellency, The Most Reverend Francis Joseph Monaghan
- Bishop of Ogdensburg titular bishop of Mela
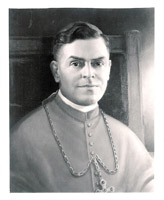
- See: Diocese of Ogdensburg
- In office: March 20, 1939 to November 13, 1942
- Predecessor: Joseph Henry Conroy
- Successor: Bryan Joseph McEntegart

Orders
- Ordination: May 29, 1915 by Basilio Pompili
- Consecration: June 29, 1937 by Thomas Walsh

Personal details
- Born: October 30, 1890 Newark, New Jersey, U.S.
- Died: November 13, 1942 (aged 52) Watertown, New York, U.S.
- Denomination: Roman Catholic
- Parents: Thomas P. and Anna Loretta (née Daly) Monaghan
- Education: Seton Hall College; Pontifical North American College
- Coat of arms

Francis Joseph Monaghan (October 30, 1890 – November 13, 1942) was an American prelate of the Roman Catholic Church. He served as bishop of the Diocese of Ogdensburg in Northern New York from 1939 to 1942. Monaghan previously served as President of Seton Hall University in New Jersey from 1933 to 1936.

== Biography ==
=== Early life ===
Francis Monaghan was born in Newark, New Jersey, to Thomas P. Monaghan and Anna Loretta (née Daly) Monaghan. He attended Seton Hall College in South Orange, New Jersey, receiving a Bachelor of Arts degree in 1911 and a Master of Arts degree in 1913. He then studied at the Pontifical North American College in Rome.

=== Priesthood ===
Monaghan was ordained to the priesthood by Cardinal Basilio Pompili in Rome on May 29, 1915. He earned a Doctor of Sacred Theology degree that same year.

Returning to New Jersey in 1915, he was appointed an assistant pastor at St. Paul of the Cross Parish in Jersey City, New Jersey. He was appointed as an assistant pastor for several months in 1926 at St. Mary's Parish in Roselle, New Jersey. However, later that year he left St. Mary's to become a professor of dogmatic theology and metaphysics at Immaculate Conception Seminary at Seton Hall. Monaghan then served as president of Seton Hall College from 1933 to 1936. He was named a papal chamberlain in 1934. That same year, he received a Doctor of Laws degree from St. Peters College in Jersey City, New Jersey.

=== Coadjutor Bishop and Bishop of Ogdensburg ===
On April 17, 1936, Monaghan was appointed coadjutor bishop of Ogdensburg and titular bishop of Mela by Pope Pius XI. He received his episcopal consecration on June 29, 1936, from Archbishop Thomas Walsh, with Bishops Joseph Conroy and Thomas H. McLaughlin serving as co-consecrators. Following the death of Bishop Conroy, Monaghan automatically succeeded him as bishop of Ogdensburg on March 20, 1939.

On September 26, 1942, Monaghan suffered a traumatic brain injury when he fell from a train platform in Watertown, New York. He was a patient at Mercy Hospital in Watertown for the next month and a half. On November 13, 1942, Francis Monaghan died from a cerebral hemorrhage and heart attack at age 52.

Catholic Church titles
Preceded by Joseph Henry Conroy	Bishop of Ogdensburg; 1939—1942	Succeeded by Bryan Joseph McEntegart
