= Thomas Andrew Donnellan =

American Catholic prelate (1914–1987)

His Excellency, The Most Reverend Thomas Andrew Donnellan
- Archbishop of Atlanta
- Archdiocese: Atlanta
- Installed: July 16, 1968
- Term ended: October 15, 1987
- Predecessor: Paul John Hallinan
- Successor: Eugene Antonio Marino
- Other post: Bishop of Ogdensburg (1964–1968)

Orders
- Ordination: June 3, 1939 by Francis Spellman
- Consecration: April 9, 1964 by Francis Spellman

Personal details
- Born: January 24, 1914 Bronx, New York, US
- Died: October 15, 1987 (aged 73) Atlanta, Georgia, US
- Buried: Arlington Memorial Park, Sandy Springs, Georgia, US
- Education: St. Joseph's Seminary; Catholic University of America
- Motto: Ministrare non ministrari (To serve, not to be served)

Styles of Thomas Andrew Donnellan
- Reference style: The Most Reverend
- Spoken style: Your Excellency
- Religious style: Archbishop
- Posthumous style: not applicable

Thomas Andrew Donnellan (January 24, 1914 – October 15, 1987) was an American prelate of the Catholic Church who served as the ninth bishop of the Diocese of Ogdensburg in New York State from 1964 to 1968, and as the second archbishop of the Archdiocese of Atlanta in Georgia from 1968 until his death in 1987.

== Biography ==
=== Early life ===
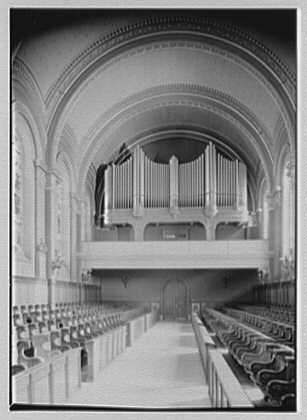
St. Joseph's Seminary, Yonkers, New York (1943)

The eldest of two children, Thomas Donnellan was born on January 24, 1914, in Bronx, New York, to Andrew and Margaret (née Egan) Donnellan. After graduating from Regis High School in the Bronx in 1931, Donnellan entered St. Joseph's Seminary in Yonkers, New York, in 1933.

=== Priesthood ===
Donnellan was ordained to the priesthood for the Archdiocese of New York at St. Patrick's Cathedral in Manhattan by Archbishop Francis Spellman on June 3, 1939. In 1942, Donnellan received a doctorate in canon law from the Catholic University of America in Washington, D.C.

Upon graduation, the archdiocese appointed Donnellan as assistant pastor of St. Patrick's Cathedral. Spellman named Donnellan as his secretary in 1954 and as chancellor in 1958. In 1962, Donnellan became the rector of St. Joseph's Seminary in Yonkers, New York.

In June 1954, Pope Pius XII named Donnellan as papal chamberlain and in 1958 as domestic prelate. In 1962, Pope John XXIII elevated Donnellan to the rank of prothonotary apostolic.

=== Bishop of Ogdensburg ===
Coat of arms as bishop of Ogdensburg

On February 28, 1964, Pope Paul VI appointed Donnellan as bishop of Ogdensburg. He was consecrated on April 9, 1964, by Cardinal Francis Spellman in St. Patrick's Cathedral and installed in Ogdensburg, New York, on April 13.

=== Archbishop of Atlanta ===
On May 29, 1968, following the death of Archbishop Paul Hallinan, Donnellan was appointed by Paul VI as the second archbishop of Atlanta; he was installed in Atlanta on July 16, 1968. During his 19-year tenure, Donnellan guided the archdiocese through extensive growth, with the number of Catholics in North Georgia nearly tripling from 50,000 in 1968 to over 133,000.

In 1968, Donnellan suspended Conald Foust, the pastor of an African-American parish in Atlanta, from his pastoral duties. An activist priest with prior problems with the archdiocese, Foust was suspended for not wearing vestments during mass and for giving communion to non-Catholics. There were reports that Foust later married.

In 1970, Donnellan barred new enrollments in the archdiocese's Catholic schools as a gesture of support to the racial integration of local public school systems.

=== Death and legacy ===
In May 1987, Donnellan suffered a stroke. He died on October 15, 1987, in Atlanta. His funeral was held at the Cathedral of Christ the King in Atlanta. It was attended by over 1,000 mourners, with the apostolic pro-nuncio in the United States, Archbishop Pio Laghi, serving as the principal celebrant.

Donnellan is buried at Arlington Cemetery in Sandy Springs, Georgia. The Archbishop Donnellan School in Atlanta, now known as Holy Spirit Preparatory School, opened in 1996.

== Viewpoints ==
=== Poverty ===
In 1984, Donnellan was a co-author of Economic Justice For All: Catholic Social Teaching and the U.S. Economy, presented at a meeting of the National Conference of Catholic Bishops. The document urged a moral perspective in viewing the economy from the vantage point of the nation's poor.

== See also ==
- Catholic Church hierarchy
- Catholic Church in the United States
- Historical list of the Catholic bishops of the United States
- List of the Catholic bishops of the United States
- Lists of patriarchs, archbishops, and bishops

== Footnotes ==
Catholic Church titles
Preceded by Paul John Hallinan	Archbishop of Atlanta; 1968–1987	Succeeded by Eugene Antonio Marino
Preceded by Leo Richard Smith	Bishop of Ogdensburg; 1964–1968	Succeeded by Stanislaus Joseph Brzana
