= Joseph N. Dinand =

His Excellency, The Most Reverend Joseph N. Dinand SJ
- Vicar Apostolic of Jamaica
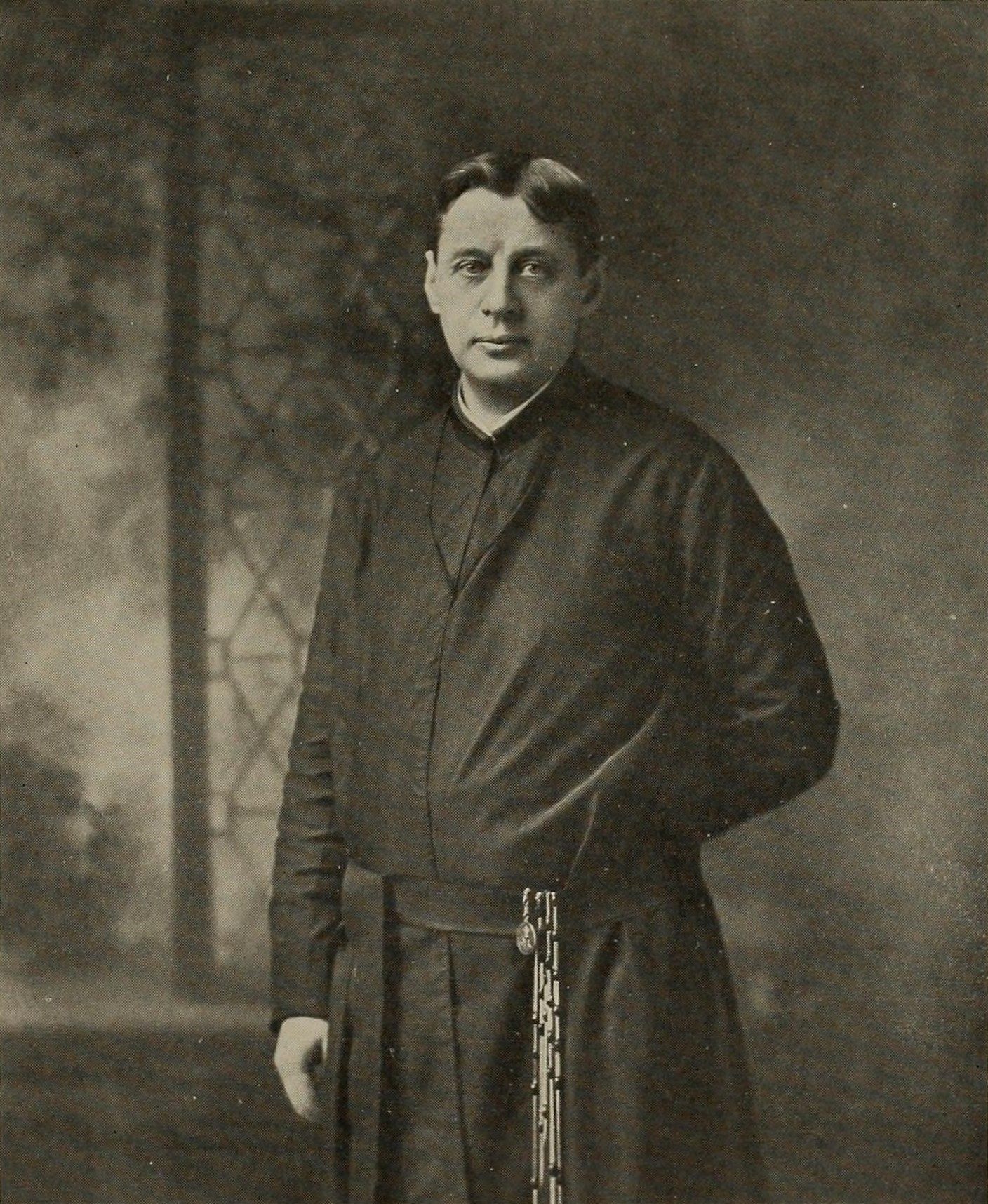
- Church: Catholic Church
- See: Titular See of Selinus
- Appointed: July 12, 1927
- In office: October 30, 1927 - October 4, 1929
- Predecessor: William F. O'Hare, S.J.
- Successor: Thomas Addis Emmet, S.J.

Orders
- Ordination: June 25, 1903 by James Gibbons
- Consecration: October 30, 1927 by Thomas M. O'Leary

Personal details
- Born: December 3, 1869 Boston, Massachusetts
- Died: July 29, 1943 (aged 73) Weston, Massachusetts

Joseph N. Dinand, S.J. (December 3, 1869 – July 29, 1943) was an American-born bishop of the Catholic Church. He twice served as president at the College of the Holy Cross from 1911 to 1918 and from 1924 to 1927. He also served as the Vicar Apostolic of Jamaica from 1927 to 1929. He was a member of the Jesuits.

== Biography ==
Joseph Nicholas Dinand was born in Boston, Massachusetts to John and Julia (Looney) Dinand. He received his primary and secondary education in Boston before enrolling in Boston College. He entered the novitiate in Frederick, Maryland, on August 15, 1877, and professed vows in the Society of Jesus (Jesuits) on August 15, 1880. He continued his education at the College of the Sacred Heart in Woodstock, Maryland and was ordained a priest there by Cardinal James Gibbons of Baltimore on June 25, 1903. He professed final vows on August 15, 1906. His ministry as a Jesuit centered on education. He was a member of the faculty of St. George's College in Kingston, Jamaica, and he served two terms as president at the College of the Holy Cross in Worcester, Massachusetts.

On July 12, 1927 Pope Pius XI appointed Dinand as the Titular Bishop of Selinus and Vicar Apostolic of Jamaica. He was consecrated by Bishop Thomas M. O'Leary of Springfield in Massachusetts on October 30, 1927. The principal co-consecrators were Bishops Joseph J. Rice of Burlington and John G. Murray of Portland. Dinand continued to serve as the Vicar Apostolic until his resignation was accepted by Pope Pius XI on October 4, 1929 for health reasons. He died in Weston, Massachusetts at the age of 73 on July 29, 1943.
