= John J. Collins (bishop) =

Most Reverend John J. Collins, S.J.
- Vicar Apostolic of Jamaica
- Church: Catholic Church
- See: Titular See of Antiphellus
- Appointed: June 12, 1907
- In office: October 28, 1907 - June 15, 1918
- Predecessor: Charles Gordon, S.J.
- Successor: William F. O'Hare, S.J.

Orders
- Ordination: August 29, 1891
- Consecration: October 28, 1907 by John Murphy Farley

Personal details
- Born: November 15, 1856 Maysville, Kentucky
- Died: November 30, 1934 (aged 78)

John J. Collins, S.J. (November 15, 1856 – November 30, 1934) was an American-born bishop of the Catholic Church. He served as the Vicar Apostolic of Jamaica from 1907 to 1918. He was also president of Fordham University 1904–1906.

== Biography ==
Born in Maysville, Kentucky, John Joseph Collins was ordained a priest on August 29, 1891. He professed vows in the Society of Jesus (Jesuits) on February 2, 1895. On June 12, 1907 Pope Pius X appointed Collins as the Titular Bishop of Antiphellus and Vicar Apostolic of Jamaica. He was consecrated a bishop by Archbishop John Farley of New York on October 28, 1907. The principal co-consecrators were Bishops Thomas Beaven of Springfield in Massachusetts and Charles McDonnell of Brooklyn. Collins served as the Vicar Apostolic until his resignation was accepted by Pope Benedict XV on June 15, 1918. He died at the age of 78 on November 30, 1934.

Prior to being consecrated a bishop in 1907, Collins served as the president of Fordham University, a Jesuit institution in the Bronx, New York, from 1904 until 1906. His tenure as president saw the completion of the university's auditorium, which was dedicated to Collins by Cardinal John Murphy Farley in 1905. Collins also finalized the sale of four acres of the university campus to the city for a municipal hospital, named Fordham Hospital. Under Collins' leadership, Fordham University formed football, basketball, and track teams, as well as opening the Fordham University School of Law in 1905, and a school of medicine that would be dissolved 1921.

American architect Raymond F. Almirall designed Holy Trinity Cathedral in Kingston at Collins' bequest.
