= Juan Gorordo =

Catholic bishop of the Philippines (1862–1934)

The Most Reverend Juan Bautista Gorordo
- Bishop of Cebu
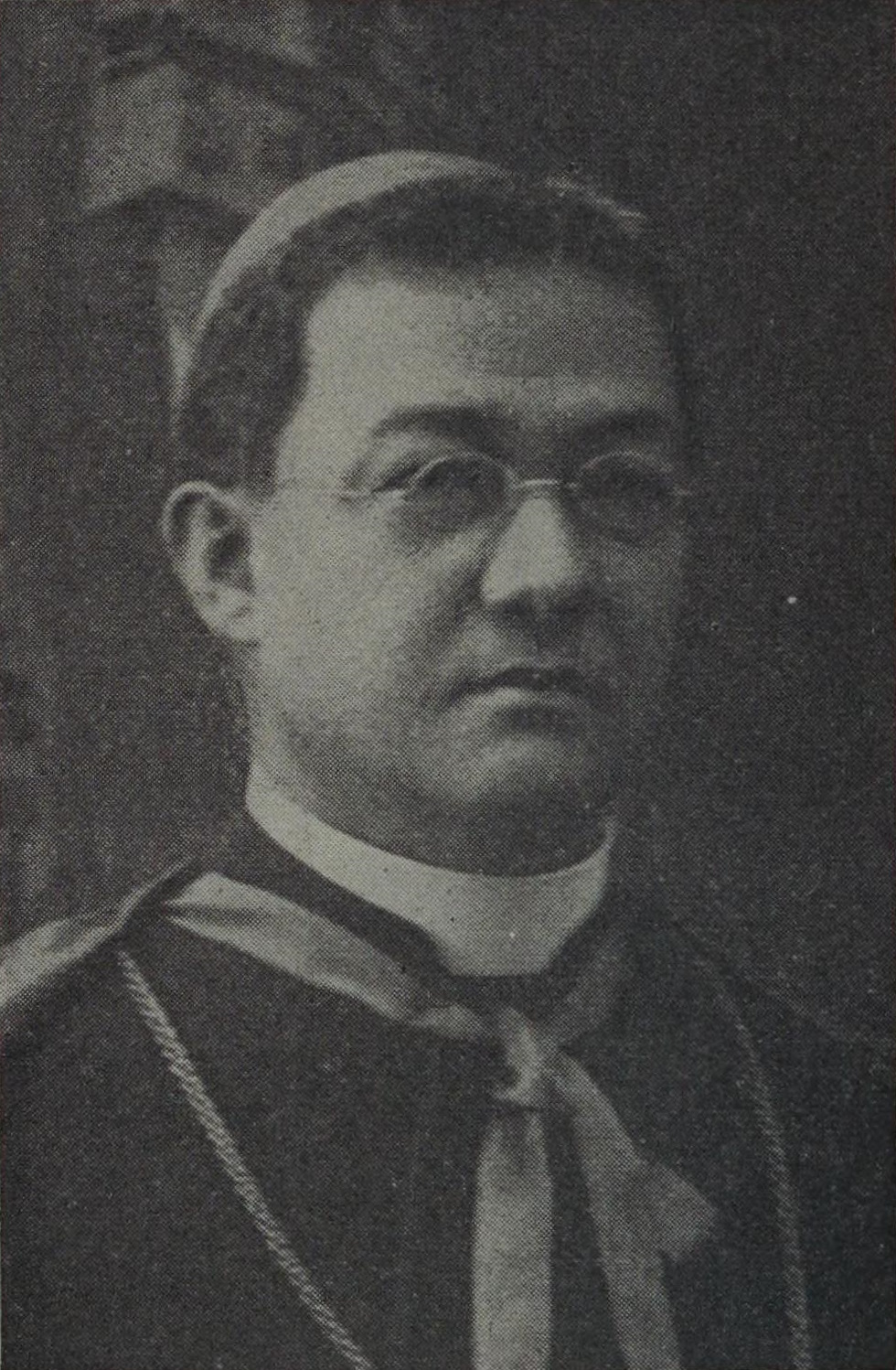
- Juan Gorordo in 1910
- See: Cebu
- Appointed: July 2, 1910
- Term ended: June 19, 1931
- Predecessor: Thomas Augustine Hendrick
- Successor: Gabriel Reyes

Orders
- Ordination: May 31, 1885
- Consecration: June 24, 1909

Personal details
- Born: October 29, 1862 Barili, Cebu, Captaincy General of the Philippines
- Died: December 20, 1934 (aged 85) Cebu, Philippines
- Denomination: Roman Catholic
- Coat of arms

Juan Bautista Gorordo was the first Cebuano appointed bishop and the second appointed bishop in the Philippines after Jorge Barlin. He served as Bishop of Cebu from 1910 until his retirement in 1931.

== Life ==
Juan Gorordo was born April 18, 1862 in Barili, Cebu, the Philippines to Don Juan Isidro Bautista de Gorordo and Doña Telesfora Garces.

He entered the Seminario de San Carlos at the age of 12, and later taught Latin and Moral Theology at the school from 1881-1884. Former member of the Philippine Assembly Filemon Sotto was a student under Gorordo.

When Spanish Bishop Martin Garcia Alcocer moved from Cebu to Manila after the fall of the Spanish government in 1899, Gorordo was named secretary and notary of the ecclesiastical curia of Cebu.

In 1905, Gorordo was named Domestic Prelate before being named Auxiliary Bishop of Cebu on April 29, 1909. Following the death of American Bishop Thomas Hendrick on November 29, 1909, Gorordo assumed the post of Bishop in 1910.

Gorordo retired from his post in 1931 and later died on December 20, 1934.

== See also ==
- Catholic Church in the Philippines

Catholic Church titles
Preceded by Thomas Augustine Hendrick	Bishop of Cebu; 1910–1931	Succeeded by Gabriel Reyes
