= Stanislaus Joseph Brzana =

American Catholic prelate (1917-1997)

His Excellency, The Most Reverend Stanislaus Joseph Brzana
- Bishop of Ogdensburg; Titular Bishop of Cufruta
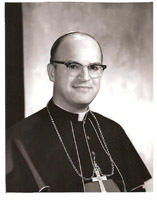
- Diocese: Ogdensburg, New York
- In office: 1968–1993
- Predecessor: Thomas Andrew Donnellan
- Successor: Paul Loverde

Orders
- Ordination: June 7, 1941 by John Aloysius Duffy
- Consecration: June 29, 1965 by James A. McNulty

Personal details
- Born: July 7, 1917 Buffalo, New York, US
- Died: March 1, 1997 (aged 79) Cheektowaga, New York, US
- Denomination: Catholic
- Parents: Frank and Catherine Brzana
- Education: St. Bonaventure University; Pontifical Gregorian University
- Motto: Deus caritas est (God is love)
- Coat of arms

Stanislaus Joseph Brzana (July 7, 1917 – March 1, 1997) was an American prelate of the Catholic Church who served as the tenth bishop of the Diocese of Ogdensburg in New York State from 1968 to 1993.

== Biography ==
=== Early life ===
Stanislaus Brzana was born on July 7, 1917, in Buffalo, New York, to Frank and Catherine (née Mikosz) Brzana. He studied at Christ the King Seminary at St. Bonaventure University in St. Bonaventure, New York.

=== Priesthood ===
Brzana was ordained to the priesthood for the Diocese of Buffalo by Bishop John Aloysius Duffy on June 7, 1941, in Buffalo. After his ordination, the diocese assigned him to missionary work at the Cattaraugus Reservation in Western New York. After the start of World War II , Brzana enlisted in the US Army Chaplain Corps. Embedded with the Ninth Armored Division, he saw action during the Battle of the Bulge in 1944 and 1945 in Belgium.

After his discharge from the US. Army, Brzana returned to pastoral work in parishes in the diocese. The diocese sent him to Rome to study at the Pontifical Gregorian University, where he earned a Doctor of Sacred Theology in 1953.

=== Auxiliary Bishop of Buffalo ===
On May 24, 1964, Brzana was appointed auxiliary bishop of Buffalo and titular bishop of Cufruta by Pope Paul VI. He received his episcopal consecration at St. Joseph's Cathedral in Buffalo on June 29, 1964, from Bishop James A. McNulty, with Bishops Celestine Damiano and James Johnston Navagh serving as co-consecrators.

=== Bishop of Ogdensburg ===
Brzana was appointed bishop of Ogdensburg by Paul VI on October 22, 1968. During his tenure, he served on committees of the National Conference of Catholic Bishops and took part in deliberations of the Second Vatican Council in Rome. He also established several churches and education centers, and was active in regional civic and social activities, including caring for striking miners and their families. In addition to receiving a Caritas award from Catholic Charities, he was made an honorary chief of the Mohawk Nation in 1977.

After 25 years in Ogdensburg, Brzana resigned on November 11, 1993. He spent his retirement in Buffalo, and later died at St. Joseph Hospital in Cheektowaga, aged 79.

Catholic Church titles
Preceded by Thomas Andrew Donnellan	Bishop of Ogdensburg; 1968–1993	Succeeded by Paul Loverde
Preceded by –	Auxiliary Bishop of Buffalo; 1964–1968	Succeeded by –
