= Thomas Addis Emmet (bishop) =

American bishop (1873–1950)

The Most Reverend Thomas A. Emmet SJ
- Vicar Apostolic of Jamaica
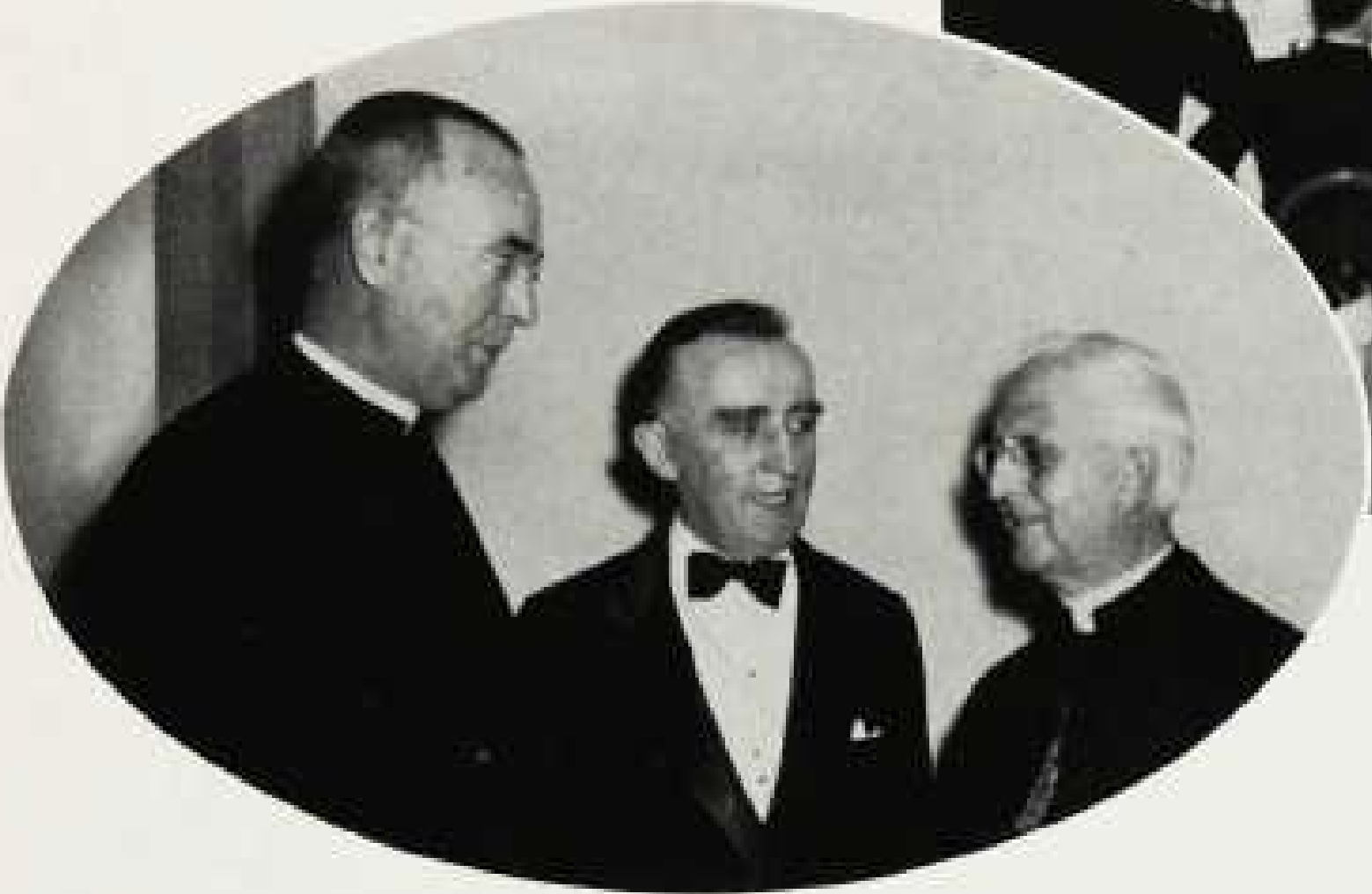
- Arthur A. O'Leary (left), Joseph C. O'Mahoney (center), and Thomas Addis Emmet (right)
- Church: Catholic Church
- See: Titular See of Tuscamia
- Appointed: July 3, 1930
- In office: September 21, 1930 – April 8, 1949
- Predecessor: Joseph N. Dinand, S.J.
- Successor: John J. McEleney, S.J.

Orders
- Ordination: July 30, 1909 by James Gibbons
- Consecration: September 21, 1930 by William Henry O'Connell

Personal details
- Born: August 23, 1873 Boston, Massachusetts
- Died: October 5, 1950 (aged 77) Boston, Massachusetts

Thomas Addis Emmet, SJ August 23, 1873 – October 5, 1950) was an American-born bishop of the Catholic Church. He served as the Vicar Apostolic of Jamaica from 1930 to 1949.

== Early life ==
Thomas Emmet was born in Boston, Massachusetts to Edward and Julia (O'Shaughnessy) Emmet. He received his primary and secondary education in Boston before enrolling in Boston College.

Emmet made his novitiate in Frederick, Maryland and professed vows in the Society of Jesus (Jesuits) on August 15, 1895. He continued his education at the College of the Sacred Heart in Woodstock, Maryland and was ordained a priest there by Cardinal James Gibbons of Baltimore on July 30, 1909. He professed final vows on February 2, 1914.

== Career ==
Emmet joined the faculty of Georgetown University in Washington, D.C. before joining the faculty of St. George's College in Kingston, Jamaica. He went to become the headmaster at Georgetown Preparatory School in North Bethesda, Maryland.

On July 3, 1930 Pope Pius XI appointed Emmet as the Titular Bishop of Tuscamia and Vicar Apostolic of Jamaica. He was consecrated a bishop by Cardinal William Henry O'Connell of Boston on September 21, 1930. The principal co-consecrators were Auxiliary Bishops John Bertram Peterson of Boston and John Michael McNamara of Baltimore.

He continued to serve as the Vicar Apostolic until his resignation was accepted by Pope Pius XII on April 8, 1949, for health reasons.

== Death ==
He died in Boston at the age of 77 on October 5, 1950.
