= Edgar Philip Prindle Wadhams =

American prelate

His Excellency, The Right Reverend Edgar Philip Prindle Wadhams
- Bishop of Ogdensburg
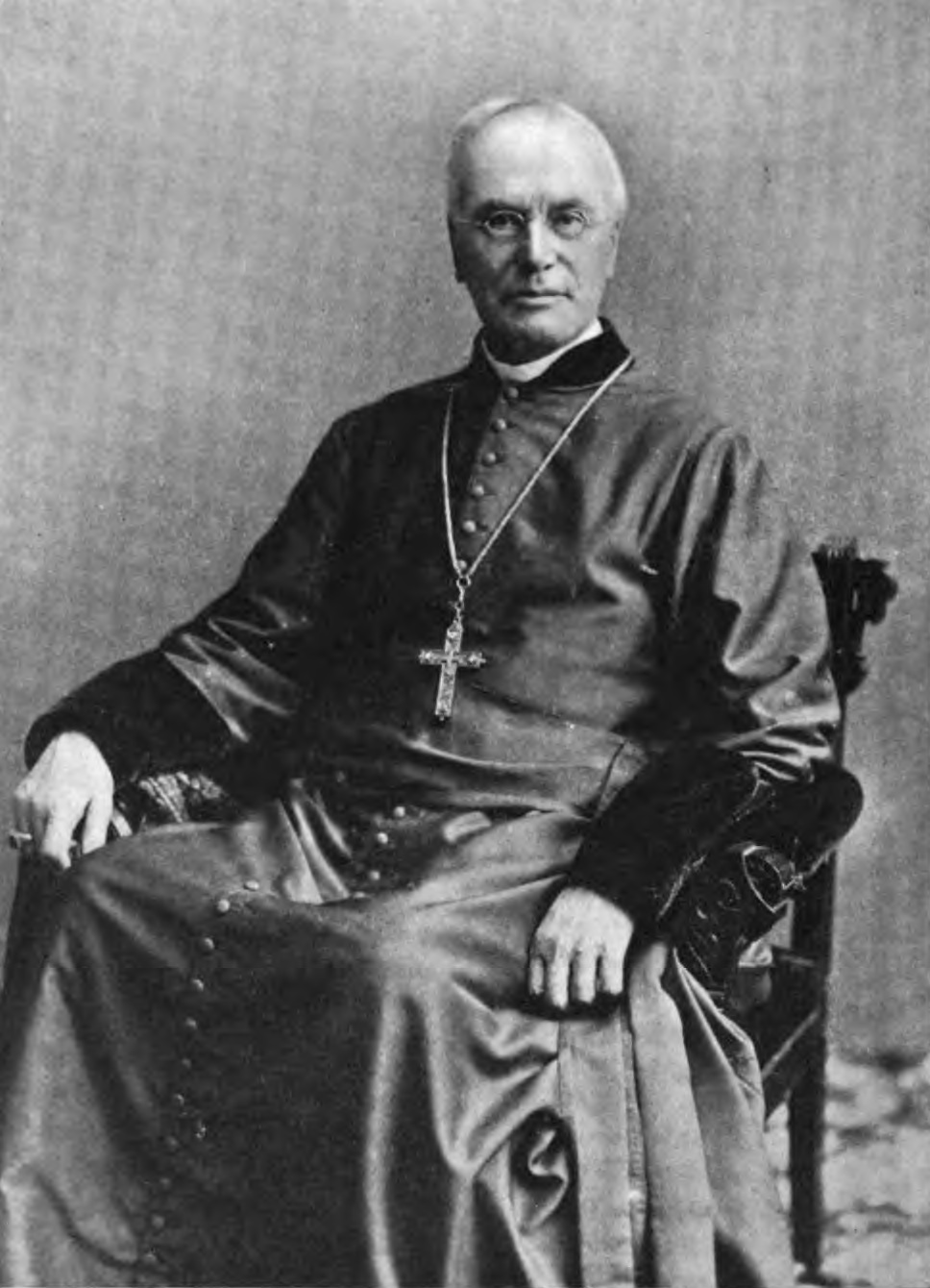
- See: Diocese of Ogdensburg
- In office: May 5, 1872 to December 5, 1891
- Predecessor: None
- Successor: Henry Gabriels

Orders
- Ordination: January 15, 1850 by John McCloskey
- Consecration: May 5, 1872 by John McCloskey

Personal details
- Born: May 17, 1817 Lewis, New York, US
- Died: December 5, 1891 (aged 74) Ogdensburg, New York, US
- Education: St. Mary’s Seminary
- Motto: Iter para tutum (Prepare a safe journey)
- Coat of arms

Edgar Philip Prindle Wadhams (May 21, 1817 – December 5, 1891) was an American prelate of the Roman Catholic Church. He served as the first bishop of the Diocese of Ogdensburg in New York State from 1872 until his death in 1891.

== Biography ==
=== Early life ===
Edgar Wadhams was born on May 21, 1817, in Lewis, New York. He attended secondary school in Shoreham, Vermont, then went to Middlebury College in Middlebury, Vermont. While at Middlebury, Wadhams joined the Episcopal Church. Deciding to become an Episcopal minister, he entered the General Theological Seminary in New York City. In 1842, Wadhams was ordained a deacon and started preaching in Ticonderoga, New York, and in Essex County, New York.

In 1846, after much soul-searching, Wadhams underwent baptism into the Catholic Church. This decision was the culmination of several years of debate with others and personal reflection. He then entered St. Mary's Seminary in Baltimore, Maryland, run by the Society of St. Sulpice, to prepare for the Catholic priesthood.

=== Priesthood ===
Wadhams was ordained in Albany, New York, by Archbishop John McCloskey into the priesthood for the Diocese of Albany on January 15, 1850.After his ordination, the diocese assigned Wadhams as an assistant pastor at the Cathedral of the Immaculate Conception Parish in Albany, later becoming its rector. He was eventually named vicar-general of the diocese. In 1865, while on a pilgrimage to Palestine, Wadhams stopped in Rome to have an audience with Pope Pius IX.

=== Bishop of Ogdensburg ===
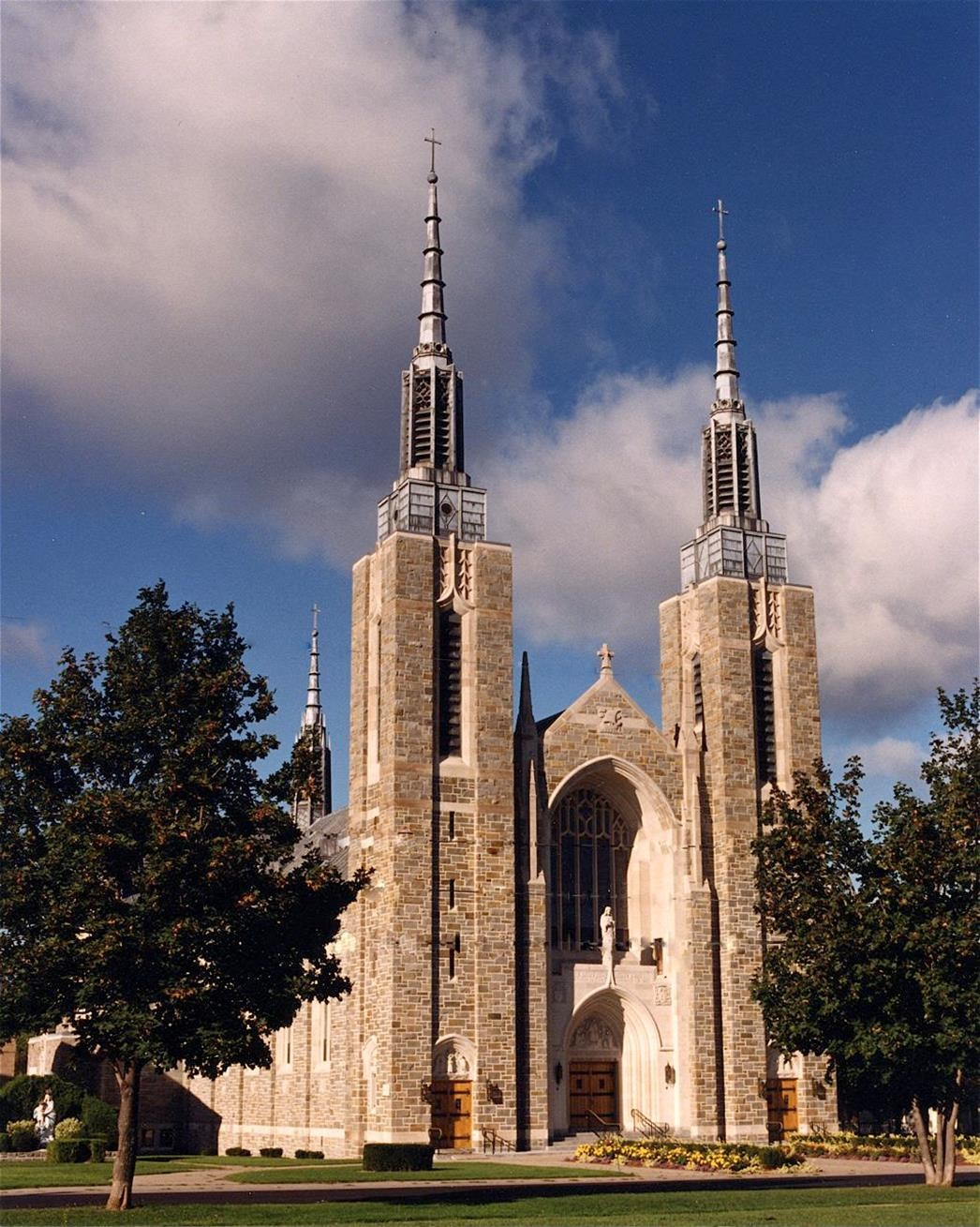
St. Mary's Cathedral, Ogdensburg, New York (2017)

On February 15, 1872, Pius IX appointed Wadhams as the first bishop of the new Diocese of Ogdensburg. He was consecrated at Albany in the Cathedral of the Immaculate Conception on May 5, 1872, by Archbishop John McCloskey. One of Wadham's first projects was to expand the small St. Mary's Church in Ogdensburg into a proper cathedral, adding a sacristy, stained glass windows and a sanctuary. He also recruited priests from Quebec and Europe for the new congregations. It was Wadham's goal to establish a school for each parish, but the economics and distances were against him. He founded schools and improved existing schools in Carthage, Plattsburgh, Ogdensburg, Keeseville, Hogansburg and Brasher Falls, New York. In 1875, Wadhams took another trip to Rome and met again with Pius IX.

Wadhams invited several women's religious orders to the diocese, where they opened orphanages, schools and hospitals. He attended the New York Provincial Council of 1883 and the Plenary Council of Baltimore of 1884, and held three diocesan synods. In 1885, Wadhams acquired a former mansion in Ogdensburg to create the Ogdensburg City Hospital and Orphans Asylum. He visited Rome one final time in 1897, meeting with Pope Leo XIII.

In early 1891, Wadham's health began to decline. After recovering from a near-death episode in February 1891, he rallied for the next several months. By November 1891, he was on his deathbed.

=== Death and legacy ===
Edgar Wadhams died in Ogdensburg on December 5, 1891, at age 74. He is buried in the crypt of St. Mary's Cathedral.

Under Wadhams, the number of churches in the diocese increased from 65 to 125; priests from 42 to 81; nuns from 23 to 129 and Catholic schools from 7 to 20; the Catholic population rose from 50,000 to 65,000. Wadhams Hall Seminary was named after Wadhams; it is now called Wadhams Hall and serve as a meeting space and retreat facility that is run by the diocese.

== Sources ==
Catholic Church titles
Preceded by None (Diocese erected)	Bishop of Ogdensburg; 1872–1891	Succeeded by Henry Gabriels
