= Patrick Joseph Hayes =

American cardinal (1867–1938)

His Eminence Patrick Joseph Hayes
- Cardinal, Archbishop of New York
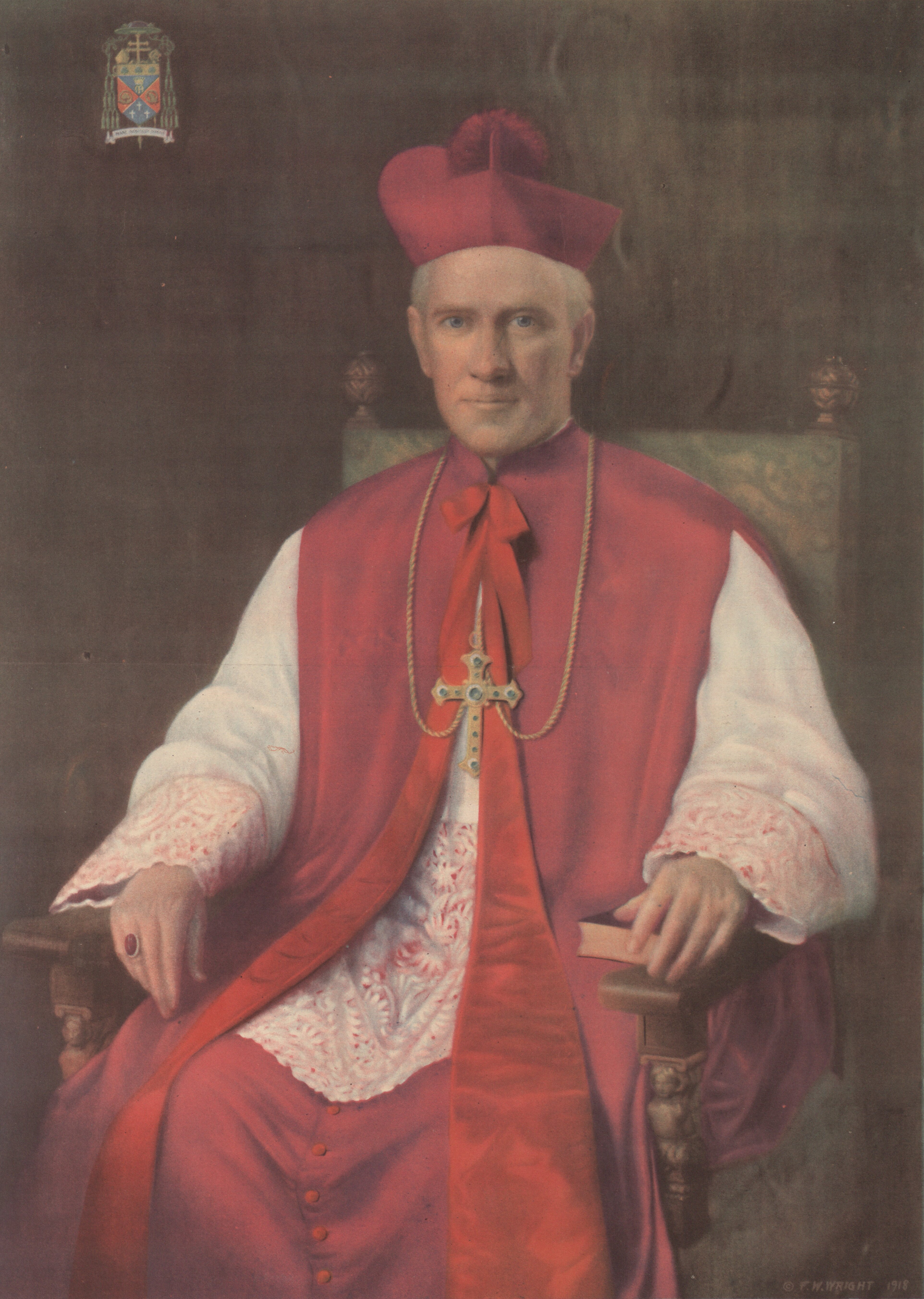
- Archdiocese: New York
- Appointed: March 10, 1919
- Installed: March 19, 1919
- Term ended: September 4, 1938
- Predecessor: John Murphy Farley
- Successor: Francis Spellman
- Other posts: Cardinal-Priest of Santa Maria in Via; Vicar Apostolic for the United States Armed Forces
- Previous post: Auxiliary Bishop of New York (1914–1919)

Orders
- Ordination: September 8, 1892 by Michael Corrigan
- Consecration: October 28, 1914 by John Murphy Farley
- Created cardinal: March 24, 1924 by Pius XI
- Rank: Cardinal-Priest

Personal details
- Born: November 20, 1867 New York City, New York, U.S.
- Died: September 4, 1938 (aged 70) Monticello, New York, U.S.
- Buried: St. Patrick's Cathedral, New York
- Motto: Domine Mane Nobiscum (Stay With Us O Lord)
- Coat of arms: Patrick Joseph Hayes's coat of arms

Ordination history of Patrick Joseph Hayes
History
Episcopal consecration
- Consecrated by: John Murphy Farley
- Date: October 28, 1914
Episcopal succession
Bishops consecrated by Patrick Joseph Hayes as principal consecrator
- William F. O'Hare, S.J.: February 25, 1920
- John Joseph Dunn: October 28, 1921
- Daniel Joseph Curley: May 1, 1923
- John Joseph Mitty: September 8, 1926
- Joseph Francis Rummel: May 28, 1928
- John Francis O'Hern: March 9, 1929
- James Edward Kearney: October 28, 1932
- James Thomas Gibbons Hayes: June 18, 1933
- Stephen Joseph Donahue: May 1, 1934
- Bartholomew J. Eustace: March 25, 1938

Styles of Patrick Hayes
- Reference style: His Eminence
- Spoken style: Your Eminence
- Religious style: Cardinal
- Posthumous style: none
- Informal style: Cardinal
- See: New York

Patrick Joseph Hayes (November 20, 1867 – September 4, 1938) was an American Catholic prelate who served as Archbishop of New York from 1919 until his death. He was elevated to the cardinalate in 1924.

== Early life and education ==
Patrick Hayes was born in the Five Points section of Manhattan to Daniel Hayes and Mary Gleason. In his own words, Hayes "was born very humble and, I may say, of poor people." Both of his parents were from County Kerry, Ireland, and moved to the United States in 1864. A younger brother, John, was born in 1870. Hayes' mother died in June 1872, and his father later remarried around 1876; a half-sister, Anastasia, was also born that year. At age 15, he was sent to live with his aunt and uncle, who ran a grocery store where Hayes then worked.

After attending La Salle Academy, Hayes studied at Manhattan College, where he excelled at philosophy and the classics and obtained a Bachelor of Arts degree with high honors in 1888. At Manhattan, he also befriended George Mundelein, who would later become Archbishop of Chicago. Hayes then attended St. Joseph's Seminary in Troy.

== Priesthood ==
Hayes was ordained to the priesthood by Archbishop Michael Corrigan on September 8, 1892. He was then sent for further studies at the Catholic University of America in Washington, D.C., earning a Licentiate of Sacred Theology in 1894.

Upon his return to New York City, Hayes was appointed Curate at St. Gabriel's Church on the Lower East Side, where he served under its pastor, John Murphy Farley (whom he would later succeed as Archbishop of New York). Hayes, following Farley's elevation to the episcopacy, served as his private secretary from 1895 to 1903, thereafter he was appointed chancellor of the Archdiocese and Rector of the Cathedral College. He was named Domestic Prelate of His Holiness on October 15, 1907.

== Early episcopal career ==
=== Auxiliary Bishop of New York ===
On July 3, 1914, Hayes was appointed Auxiliary Bishop of New York and Titular Bishop of Thagaste by Pope Pius X. He received his episcopal consecration on the following October 28 from Cardinal Farley, with Bishops Henry Gabriels and Thomas Cusack serving as co-consecrators, at St. Patrick's Cathedral.

=== Bishop for the Military Services ===
Hayes was later named Vicar Apostolic of Military, USA, on November 24, 1917. Serving as head of the American military ordinariate during World War I, he recruited hundreds of priests as commissioned officers or chaplains. He was also one of the four episcopal members of the executive committee of the National Catholic War Council.

== Archbishop of New York ==
Following the death of Cardinal Farley in September 1918, Hayes was appointed by Pope Benedict XV as the fifth Archbishop of New York on March 10, 1919. He was formally installed as Archbishop on the following March 19. He founded the archdiocesan Catholic Charities in 1920, and subsequently became known as "the Cardinal of Charities." In a 1921 pastoral letter, Hayes strongly condemned abortion, contraception and divorce. He had the first convention of the American Birth Control League raided, and later called its members "prophets of decadence". He welcomed the election of Éamon de Valera as President of the Irish Republic and contributed $1,000 to Sinn Féin.

=== Cardinal ===
Pope Pius XI created him Cardinal Priest of Santa Maria in Via in the consistory of March 24, 1924. It was speculated that the Pope delayed his elevation to the Sacred College of Cardinals because a group affiliated with New York's St. Patrick's Cathedral had stoned the Union Club for flying a British flag, but Pius nevertheless warmly greeted Hayes at the consistory as "dear little brother".

The cardinal opposed Prohibition, backed legislation to limit indecency on the stage, and endorsed unemployment relief during the Great Depression. Commenting on the Depression in 1931, he stated, "The American people are experiencing a return to religion following a period of carelessness and cynicism marked by the prosperity of the land...Now they are returning when they find they are in need of something greater than the material in facing adversity and stress."

After the Rev. Charles Coughlin praised the former Mayor Jimmy Walker in New York, Hayes, who had earlier denounced Walker for his perceived lack of morality, ruled that no ecclesiastical visitor might address a religious gathering without the cardinal's permission.

On June 24, 1924, he offered the invocation at the opening of the 1924 Democratic National Convention. He used his Tammany Hall connections to line up Democratic support in Congress for legislation protecting Catholic schools in the Philippines in 1932. During the Spanish Civil War, Hayes was outspoken in his support for the fascist-nationalist forces of General Franco, "claiming that 'Loyalists are controlled by radicals and communists'."

Hayes had a summer house in the Catskill Mountains, near St. Joseph's camp, maintained by the Amityville Dominican nuns; he once encountered a group of Klansmen there.

== Death and legacy ==
In September 1938, Hayes died from a heart attack, caused by coronary thrombosis, in Monticello, New York, at age 70.

Cardinal Hayes High School in The Bronx is named after him.

== Images ==
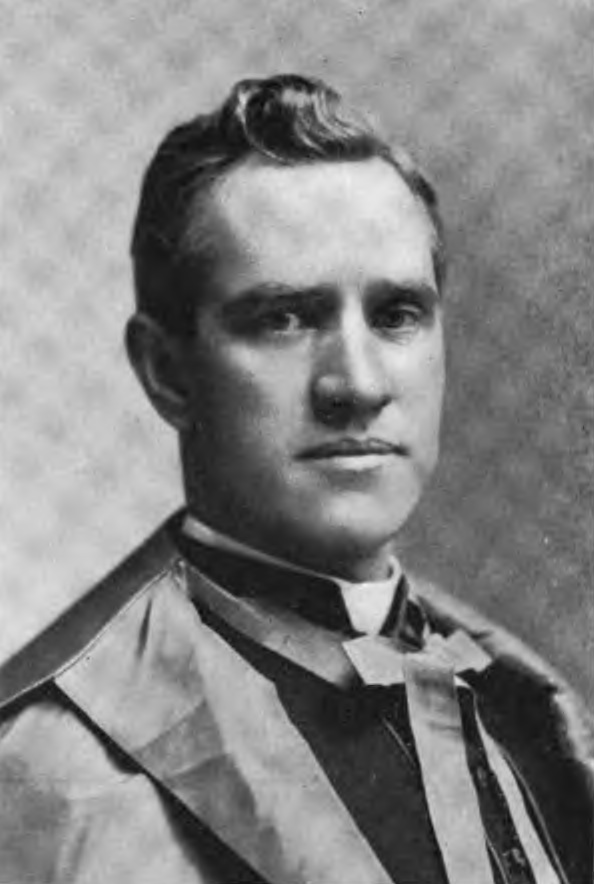
Hayes as the Archdiocesan Chancellor and President of Cathedral College

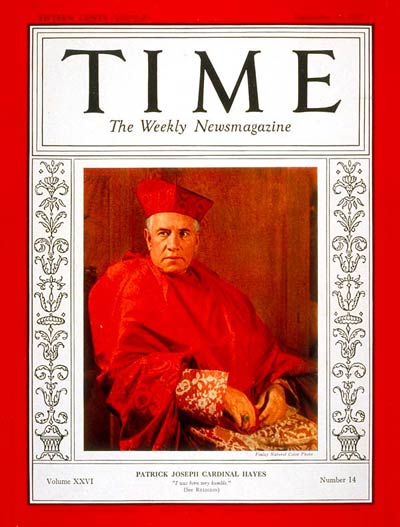
Cardinal Hayes on the September 30, 1935, cover of Time

== See also ==
- Catholic Church hierarchy
- Catholic Church in the United States
- Historical list of the Catholic bishops of the United States
- Insignia of chaplain schools in the United States military
- International Military Chiefs of Chaplains Conference
- List of Catholic bishops of the United States
- List of Catholic bishops of the United States: military service
- Lists of patriarchs, archbishops, and bishops
- Military chaplain
- Religious symbolism in the United States military
- United States military chaplains

Catholic Church titles
Preceded by —	Apostolic Vicar for the Military Services; 1917 – 1938	Succeeded by Francis Spellman
Preceded by John Murphy Farley	Archbishop of New York; 1919 – 1938	Succeeded by Francis Spellman
Preceded by –	Auxiliary Bishop of New York; 1914 – 1919	Succeeded by –
