= Henry Gabriels =

Belgian-born prelate

His Excellency, The Right Reverend Henry Gabriels
- Bishop of Ogdensburg
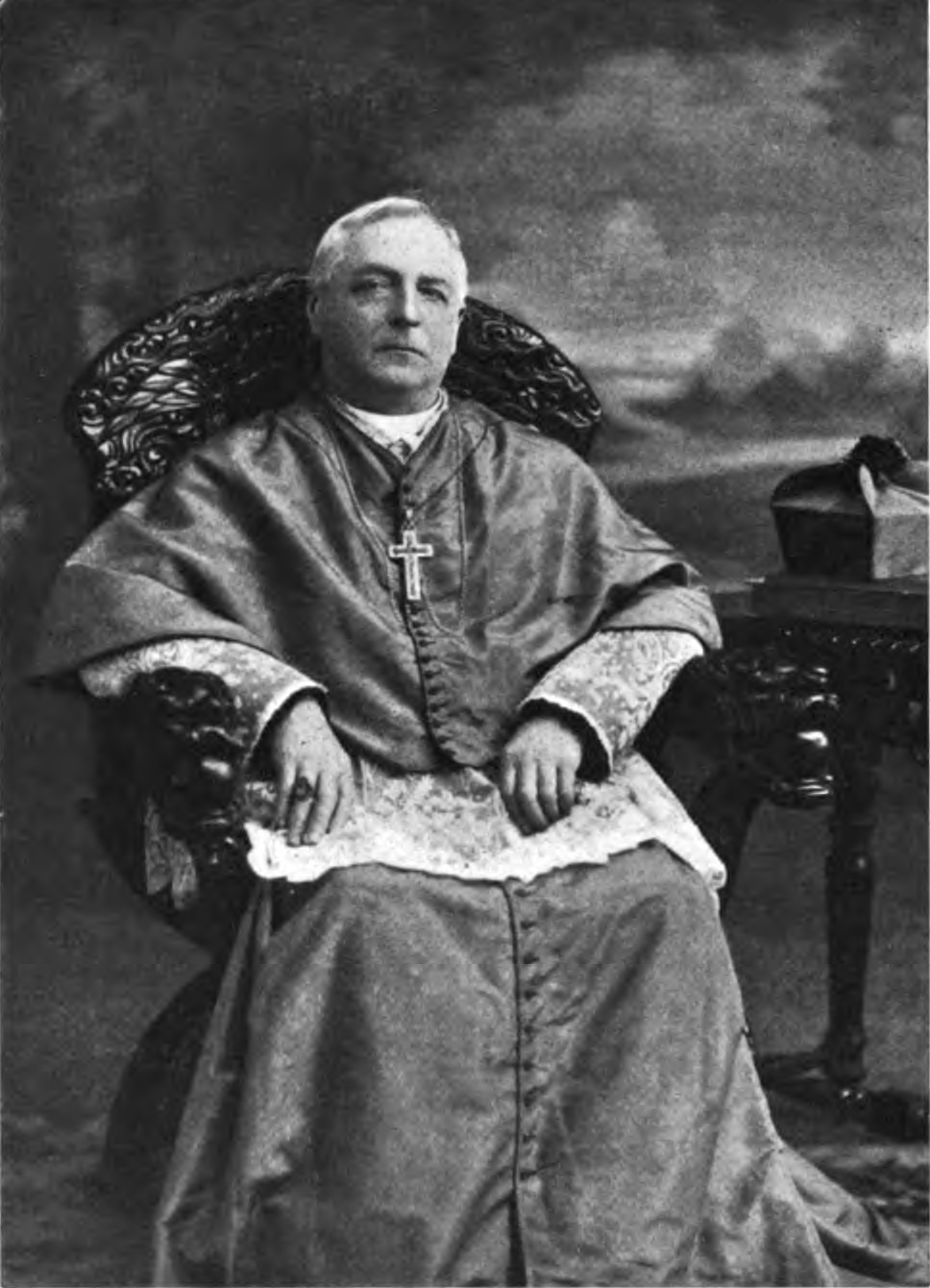
- See: Diocese of Ogdensburg
- Predecessor: Edgar Philip Prindle Wadhams
- Successor: Joseph Henry Conroy

Orders
- Ordination: September 21, 1861 by Louis-Joseph Delebecque
- Consecration: May 5, 1892 by Michael Corrigan

Personal details
- Born: October 6, 1838 Wannegem-Lede, East Flanders, Belgium
- Died: April 23, 1921 (aged 82)
- Denomination: Roman Catholic
- Education: University of Leuven

Henry Gabriels (October 6, 1838 – April 23, 1921) was a Belgian-born prelate of the Roman Catholic Church who served as bishop of the Diocese of Ogdensburg in New York State from 1892 until his death in 1921.

== Biography ==
=== Early life ===
Henry Gabriels was born on October 6, 1838, at Wannegem-Lede, East Flanders in Belgium. He studied classics at St. Mary's College in Oudenaarde, Belgium and philosophy at the St. Joseph Minor Seminary in Ghent, Belgium. In 1858, having decided to enter the priesthood, he enrolled in St. Nicholas Seminary in Ghent, where he studied theology for two years. In late 1860, Gabriels entered the University of Leuven in Leuven, Belgium.

=== Priesthood ===
Gabriels was ordained to the priesthood in Ghent by Bishop Louis-Joseph Delebecque on September 21, 1861. He received a Bachelor of Theology degree in 1862 and a Licentiate in Theology in 1864. That same year, Archbishop John McCloskey of New York was attempting to establish a provincial seminary in New York, which would train priests for multiple dioceses in the Northeastern United States. While visiting in Ghent, he asked Delebecque to suggest some priests who might want to work at the new St. Joseph's Seminary in Troy, New York. Delebecque proposed four new priests, including Gabriels. When McCloskey offered him a faculty chair at St. Joseph's, Gabriels eagerly agreed.

Gabriels arrived in New York in October 1864. He served as professor of dogma at St. Joseph's for seven years. He was able to visit his family in Belgium in 1867. In 1868, Gabriels learned about a small community of German and Irish Catholics near Sand Lake, New York, who did not have a church or a priest. Since Gabriels spoke some German, he started spending time there, celebrating mass in a private residence while organizing a new parish.

By 1870, Gabriels was also teaching church history and Philosophy at St. Joseph's. In July 1871, McCloskey appointed Gabriels as president of St. Joseph's, a position he would hold until 1892. From 1876-1887, Henry Gabriels was a member of the Bishop's Council of the Diocese of Albany. From 1887-1892, Henry Gabriels was a Diocesan Consultor. From 1887-1892 Henry Gabriels was a Synodal Examiner for The Diocese of Albany. From 1887-1891, Henry Gabriels was on the Diocesan Board of Examination. In 1882, he received an honorary Doctor of Theology degree from the University of Leuven.

When the Fourth Provincial Council of New York was held in New York City in 1883, Gabriels served as secretary. For the Third Plenary Council of Baltimore in Baltimore, Maryland in 1884, Gabriels was named as a general secretary.

=== Bishop of Ogdensburg ===
On December 20, 1891, Gabriels was appointed as the second bishop of Ogdensburg by Pope Leo XIII. He received his episcopal consecration on May 5, 1892, from Archbishop Michael Corrigan, with Bishops Francis McNeirny and Patrick Anthony Ludden serving as co-consecrators, at the Cathedral of the Immaculate Conception in Albany, New York. He was installed at St. Mary's Cathedral in Ogdensburg by Bishop Bernard McQuaid on 11 May 1892. In 1894, the Gabriels Sanitarium for tuberculosis patients opened in a hamlet that became known as Gabriels, New York. Charles George Hebermann, editor of the Catholic Encyclopedia, gave this description of Gabriels:

Conscientious in the discharge of his duties, ever ready to go where duty called, affable to all, both rich and poor, zealous for the interests of the Church, he was soon known in every part of the diocese, and where he was known, he was loved and respected.

In August 1906, Gabriels met in Rome with Pope Pius X, delivering a personal message from U.S. President Theodore Roosevelt and a Peter's Pence contribution of $1,350. Gabriels wrote the "Diocese of Ogdensburg" article for the Catholic Encyclopedia. He was an officer of the Order of Leopold. During his 29 years as bishop, he established several churches and schools.

=== Death ===
Henry Gabriels died on April 23, 1921, at age 82. The Gabriels Sanitarium campus was purchased in 1965 by Paul Smith's College, then sold to the State of New York to become Camp Gabriels, a medium security prison, in 1982. The prison closed in 2009. The hamlet of Gabriels still exists.

=== Family ===
His nephew Henry E. Gabriels, born in Belgium, graduated as a civil engineer from Rensselaer Polytechnic Institute in 1910. He died on 6 March 1943 in Glens Falls, New York.

== Bibliography ==
Collins, Geraldine, The Brighton story, Being the History of Paul Smiths, Gabriels, and Rainbow Lake. North Country Books (1977)

Gabriels, Henry, Historical Sketch of St. Joseph's Provincial Seminary, Troy, New York, publisher The United States Catholic Historical Society, New York (1905)

Gabriels, Henry, Questiones Mechlinienses in Rubricas Breviarii et Missalis Romani: Provinciis Foederatis Americae Septentrionalis Adaptate, F. Pustet, (1887) 180 pages

Gabriels, Henry, Rudiments of the Hebrew Grammar, translated from the seventh Latin edition of Vosen-Kaulen's "Rudimenta", B. Herder publisher, St Louis, Missouri (1888) (Translation of: Christian H. Vosen & Franz Kaulen, Rudimenta linguae hebraicae: scholis publicis et domesticae disciplinae. Brevissime Accommodata. Herder Verlag 1862).

Taylor, Mary Christine, A history of Catholicism in the north country / by Sister Mary Christine Taylor, S.S.J., PH.D., Camden NY, Farnsworth Sons, 1972, 290 pages, illustrations.

Catholic Church titles
| Preceded by Edgar Philip Prindle Wadhams | Bishop of Ogdensburg; 1892–1921 | Succeeded by Joseph Henry Conroy |
