= William F. O'Hare =

Most Reverend William F. O'Hare, S.J.
- Vicar Apostolic of Jamaica
- Church: Catholic Church
- See: Titular See of Maximianopolis in Arabia
- Appointed: September 2, 1919
- In office: February 25, 1920 - October 11, 1926
- Predecessor: John J. Collins, S.J.
- Successor: Joseph N. Dinand, S.J.

Orders
- Ordination: June 25, 1903 by James Gibbons
- Consecration: February 25, 1920 by Patrick Joseph Hayes

Personal details
- Born: January 23, 1870 Boston, Massachusetts
- Died: October 11, 1926 (aged 56)

William F. O'Hare, S.J. (January 23, 1870 – October 11, 1926) was an American-born bishop of the Catholic Church. He served as the Vicar Apostolic of Jamaica from 1920 to 1926.

== Biography ==
Born in South Boston, William Francis O'Hare received his primary and secondary education in Boston before enrolling in Boston College. He made his novitiate in Frederick, Maryland and professed vows in the Society of Jesus (Jesuits) on August 15, 1880. O'Hare continued his education at the College of the Sacred Heart in Woodstock, Maryland and was ordained a priest there by Cardinal James Gibbons of Baltimore on June 25, 1903. He professed final vows on August 15, 1906. On September 2, 1919 Pope Benedict XV appointed O'Hare as the Titular Bishop of Maximianopolis in Arabia and Vicar Apostolic of Jamaica. He was consecrated a bishop by Archbishop Patrick Hayes of New York on February 25, 1920. The principal co-consecrators were Bishops Thomas Beaven of Springfield in Massachusetts and Edmund Gibbons of Albany. O'Hare served as the Vicar Apostolic until his death at the age of 56 on October 11, 1926.
