= St. Mary's Cathedral (Ogdensburg, New York) =

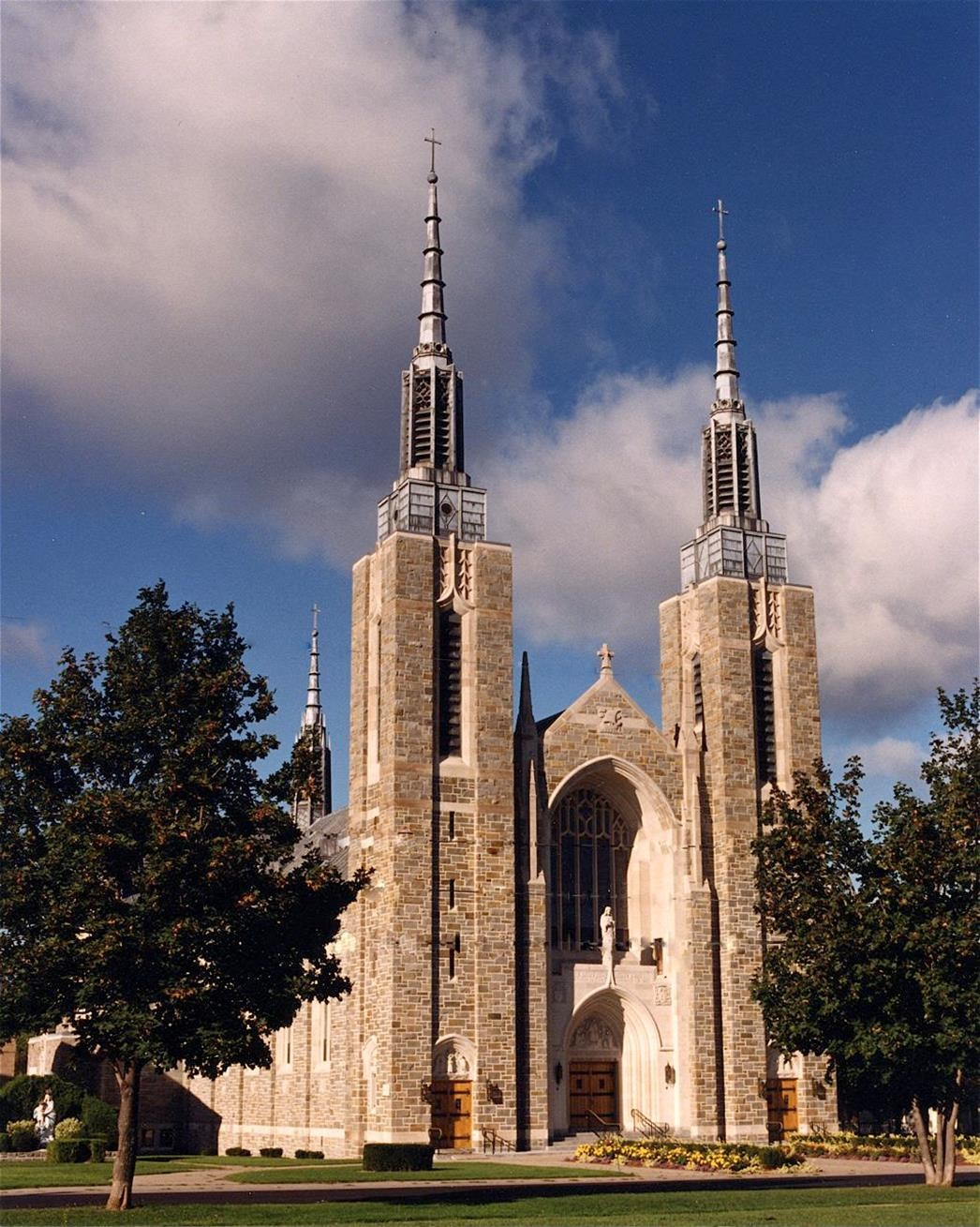
- St. Mary's Cathedral

- Location in New York
- 44°41′56″N 75°29′09″W
- Location: 415 Hamilton St. Ogdensburg, New York
- Country: United States
- Denomination: Roman Catholic Church
- Website: ogdensburgcatholics.org

History
- Founded: 1827
- Consecrated: October 22, 1952

Architecture
- Style: Gothic Revival
- Completed: 1952

Administration
- Diocese: Ogdensburg

Clergy
- Bishop: Most Rev. Terry R. LaValley
- Rector: Rev. John M. Demo
- Vicar: Rev. Lukas H. Gruber

St. Mary's Cathedral is a Catholic cathedral located in Ogdensburg, New York, United States. It is the seat of the Diocese of Ogdensburg. St. Mary's parish was founded in 1827. The original St. Mary's Cathedral was located at Montgomery and Franklin Streets. The cornerstone was laid in 1855 and it was destroyed in a fire on November 25, 1947. The current cathedral was completed in 1952 and consecrated on October 22 of that year.

== See also ==
- List of Catholic cathedrals in the United States
- List of cathedrals in the United States
- List of cathedrals in New York
