= Basilica of the Sacred Heart of Jesus, Syracuse =

Coordinates: 43.052079°N 76.179138°W

Basilica of the Sacred Heart of Jesus
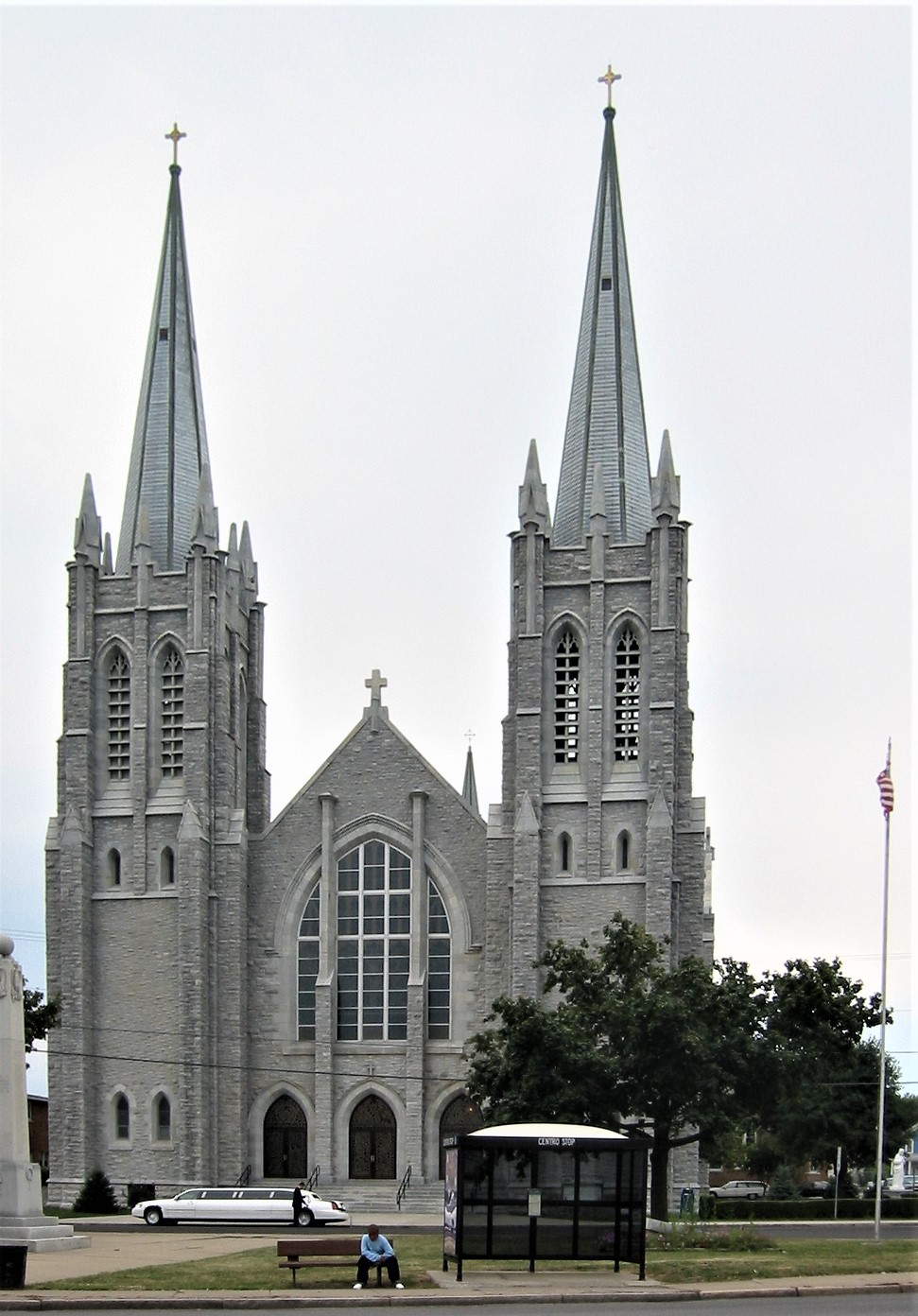
- Basilica of the Sacred Heart of Jesus
- Location: 927 Park Avenue; Syracuse, New York
- Country: United States
- Denomination: Roman Catholic
- Website: Sacred Heart Basilica website

History
- Former name: Sacred Heart of Jesus Parish
- Dedicated: October 3, 1999
- Consecrated: June 5, 1910

Architecture
- Architect(s): Merrick and Randall

Administration
- Province: New York
- Diocese: Syracuse
- Parish: Sacred Heart

Clergy
- Bishop: Most Rev. Douglas Lucia
- Rector: Rev. Andrew E. Baranski, V.F.

The Basilica of the Sacred Heart of Jesus is a Catholic parish church and minor basilica in Syracuse, New York. It is located at 927 Park Avenue in the Westside neighborhood. The building was designated a minor basilica by Pope John Paul II on August 27, 1998, and dedicated on October 3, 1999.

== History ==
The church was founded in 1892 as Sacred Heart Parish in the Westside, a neighborhood with a large ethnic Polish population, after the Polish immigrant community petitioned Syracuse's bishop for a national parish of its own. The original church was located across the street from the current structure. The first Mass in the new parish church was said on August 30, 1892, with the formal dedication taking place nearly a year later on June 11, 1893.

The congregation outgrew the first church within a decade, decided was made to construct a new church. The foundations were built by parishioners in order to save money, and the cornerstone was laid in 1907. Work was completed in three years, and the church was completed and dedicated on June 5, 1910, by Paul Peter Rhode, the Polish-born auxiliary bishop of Chicago .

Following the construction of the new church building, the old church building was converted into a parochial school. That structure burned in a fire in 1916 and was replaced by a larger brick school. The new building was expanded again in 1926, to accommodate the continued growth of the parish. Additional community buildings were constructed up to the 1940s. Sacred Heart High School closed in June 1975. In 2002 a decision was made to close the parish school because of declining enrollment; some Catholic families had moved out of the neighborhood and others no longer chose parochial school.

In July 2017, the basilica celebrated 125 years as a parish church. The basilica is in the middle of a project to install a new pipe organ. The new organ is a 1927 Skinner Organ, Opus 669. The Skinner organ was originally built and installed at the First Church of Christ, Scientist on Genesee Street in downtown Syracuse; this congregation closed in 2003. The Skinner organ replaces a smaller Moller organ, built and installed in the basilica in 1910. The Moller organ had fallen into disrepair, and needed to be replaced.

== Architecture and notable features ==
The cruciform building was designed by Syracuse architects Merrick and Randall, and built in stone with a marble veneer in Gothic Revival style. With a capacity of 1,200, it is 162 feet (49 m) long and 105 feet (32 m) across at its widest point. Its two spires are 212 feet (65 m) high.

The church features a series of fine stained glass windows from Munich, the Henry Keck Stained Glass Studio in Syracuse and from St Louis. One stained glass window depicts Polish saint Maximilian Kolbe, who was murdered at Auschwitz. It contains a 1910 Möller organ. That organ is being replaced during the spring of 2018. The original asphalt-shingled roof was replaced in 2009 with slate and copper, in order to ensure longevity.

== Elevation to basilica status ==
Pope John Paul II issued a Papal bull to elevate Sacred Heart to a minor basilica in 1998. The formal dedication took place on October 3, 1999, with Syracuse Bishop James Moynihan reading the Papal bull and Auxiliary Bishop Thomas Costello acting as Celebrant.

== External sources ==
- Basilica of the Sacred Heart of Jesus website
- Basilica Facebook page
- Article about the basilica
