= Church of St. John the Evangelist (Syracuse, New York) =

American Roman Catholic church

Coordinates: 43°3′10.5″N 76°8′57.5″W

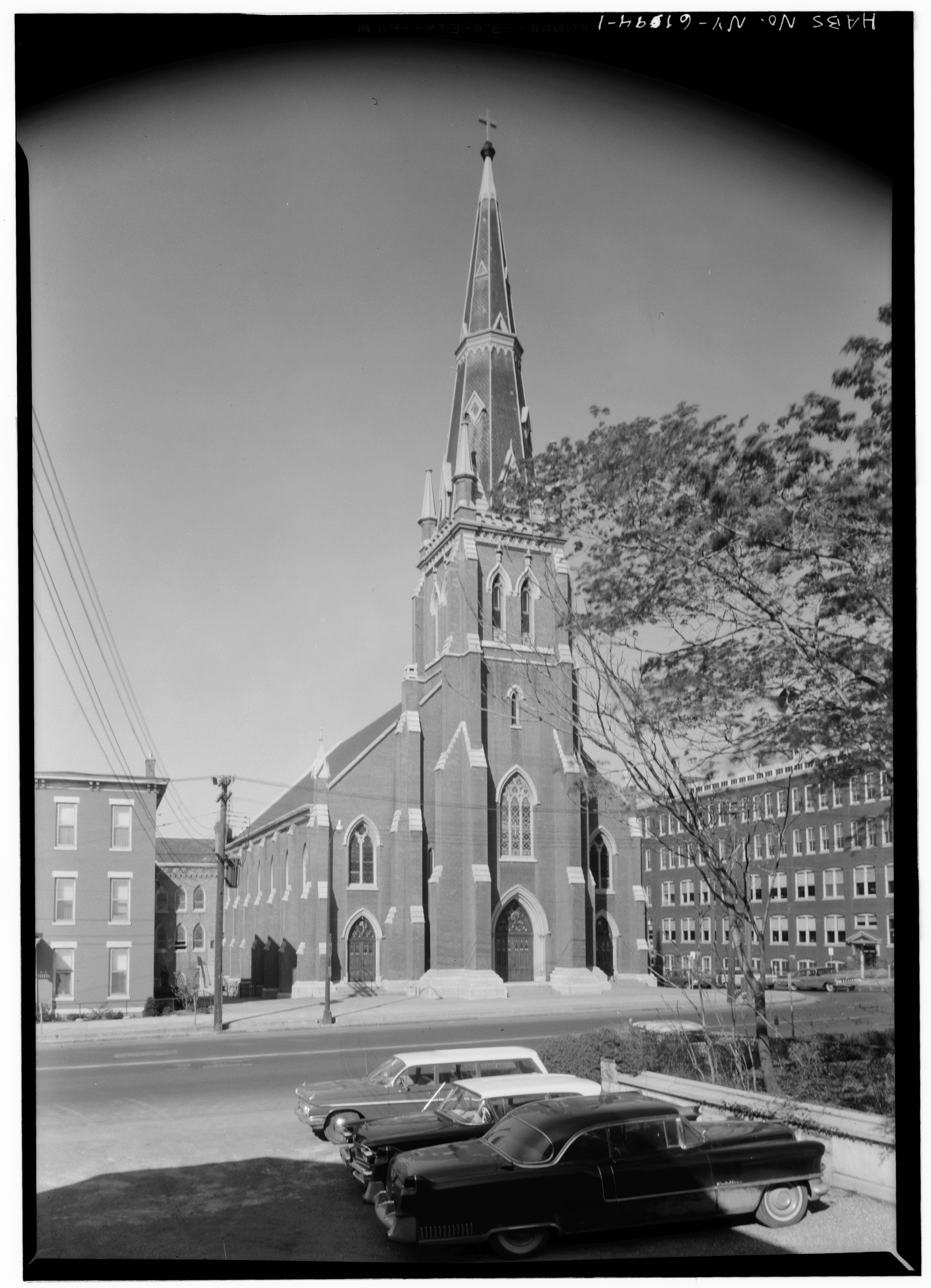
The Church, c. 1960

The Church of St. John the Evangelist was a church in the Roman Catholic Diocese of Syracuse on 215 North State Street from 1855 to its closure in June 2010. Since 2015 the church building has housed the Samaritan Center, Syracuse's largest soup kitchen.

== Description ==
The church was described in Architecture Worth Saving in Onondaga County (1964) as being able to seat 1,800 people. It was constructed in the Gothic Revival architectural style and is centered around a large stone tower.

== History ==
The Church of St. John the Evangelist was organized in 1852 as an earlier Catholic Church in Syracuse, St. Mary's Church, had grown too large. Construction of the new building was completed in 1854.

The church was opened in 1855, making it the city's fourth Roman Catholic church. John McMenoy served as its first pastor until 1868. It was selected by Patrick Anthony Ludden as the city's first cathedral upon establishment of the Roman Catholic Diocese of Syracuse in 1887, and as a result was expanded and renovated. The church ceased serving as cathedral after "several decades". It was closed in June 2010 by the Bishop Robert Cunningham and merged with the Cathedral of the Immaculate Conception.

In 2015, the Samaritan Center, Syracuse's largest soup kitchen, announced that it would move to occupy the church building, after a three year search. The Samaritan Center was founded in 1981 in St. Paul's Episcopal Church, but as it grew the location became inadequate. After deciding on the Church of St. John the Evangelist, the center spent $1.45 million purchasing and renovating it. Portions of the church building were re-used, for instance the pews were converted into dining seats. The center can hold 180 people at a time.
