= Bishop Ludden-Grimes Junior/Senior High School =

Private, coeducational school in Syracuse, New York, United States

Location
- 815 Fay Road; Syracuse, (Onondaga County), New York 13219; United States; 43°2′3″N 76°12′27″W

Information
- Type: Private, Coeducational
- Religious affiliation: Catholic
- Patron saint: Carlo Acutis
- Established: 2025
- School district: Diocese of Syracuse
- Dean: Timothy Schmidt
- Principal: Kevin Murphy
- Grades: 7–12
- Colors: Green and white
- Athletics conference: OHSL
- Mascot: Gaelic Knight
- Website: ludden-grimes.org

Bishop Ludden-Grimes Junior/Senior High School is a private, Catholic high school in Syracuse, New York in the United States. It is located within the Diocese of Syracuse.

== History ==
Bishop Ludden–Grimes Junior/Senior High School was established in 2025 through the consolidation of Bishop Ludden Junior/Senior High School and Bishop Grimes Junior/Senior High School. The school is named in honor of the first two bishops of the Diocese of Syracuse: Bishop Patrick Anthony Ludden and Bishop John Grimes. In February 2025, the Diocese of Syracuse announced that Bishop Grimes Junior/Senior High School and Bishop Ludden Junior/Senior High School would close at the end of the 2024–25 academic year. The two schools were merged to form a single institution, Bishop Ludden–Grimes Junior/Senior High School, located on the former Bishop Ludden campus. Following the 2025 consolidation of Bishop Ludden and Bishop Grimes, students from the formerly rival schools were integrated into a single student body. Reports noted that students experienced an initial period of adjustment as they adapted to a shared academic and social environment. The school's architectural design is cruciform, with a central chapel located at the center of the building.

== Academics ==
Bishop Ludden-Grimes Junior-Senior High School is an accredited International Baccalaureate (IB) World School, authorized to offer the IB Diploma Program with multiple Advanced Placement (AP) courses. Foreign languages offered include: Spanish, French, and American Sign Language. AP course offerings include: AP English Language and Composition, AP Calculus, AP Statistics, and AP World History. IB course offerings include: IB Visual Arts SL, IB English: Language A: Literature, IB Mathematics Analysis & Approaches HL, IB Biology SL, IB Environmental Systems and Societies SL, IB Global Politics SL, IB History HL, IB French and Spanish B SL, and IB Core.

The school participates in dual enrollment programs, including Syracuse University Project Advance, the Pre-Collegiate Bridge Program with Le Moyne College and a partnership with Onondaga Community College. Courses offered through the SUPA Program includes Introduction to Esports and Principles and Contemporary Issues in Sport Management.

== Athletics ==
Boys' soccer won the Section III Class C championship in 2025, months after the school's establishment.

Girl's volleyball won the Section III Class C championship in 2026.
