= David Frederick Cunningham =

American prelate (1900–1979)

His Excellency, The Most Reverend David Frederick Cunningham
- Bishop of Syracuse
- In office: 1970 to 1976
- Predecessor: Walter Andrew Foery
- Successor: Frank J. Harrison
- Previous posts: Auxiliary Bishop of Syracuse (1950 to 1967); Coadjutor Bishop of Syracuse (1967 to 1970)

Orders
- Ordination: June 12, 1926 by Daniel Joseph Curley
- Consecration: June 8, 1950 by Cardinal Francis Spellman

Personal details
- Born: December 3, 1900 Walkerville, Montana, US
- Died: February 22, 1979 (aged 78) Syracuse, New York, US
- Buried: St. Mary's Cemetery, DeWitt
- Denomination: Roman Catholic
- Parents: David and Mary Ann (Fitzgerald) Cunningham
- Education: St. Michael's College; St. Bernard's Seminary
- Motto: All in charity

Styles of David Frederick Cunningham
- Reference style: His Excellency; The Most Reverend
- Spoken style: Your Excellency
- Religious style: Bishop

David Frederick Cunningham (December 3, 1900 – February 22, 1979) was an American prelate of the Roman Catholic Church. He served as bishop of Syracuse in New York State from 1970 to 1976. He previously served as coadjutor bishop of Syracuse from 1967 to 1970 and auxiliary bishop of Syracuse from 1950 to 1967.

== Biography ==
=== Early life ===
David Cunningham was born on December 3, 1900, in Walkerville, Montana, to David and Mary Ann (Fitzgerald) Cunningham. He was raised in Oswego, New York. He attended St. Michael's College in Toronto, Ontario, before returning to New York and studying at St. Bernard's Seminary in Rochester, New York.

=== Priesthood ===
He was ordained to the priesthood for the Diocese of Syracuse on June 12, 1926 at St. Patrick's Cathedral in Rochester by Bishop Daniel Joseph Curley. After his ordination, the diocese assigned Cunningham as a curate at St. Ambrose Parish in Endicott, New York. He was later sent to Washington D.C. to study canon law at the Catholic University of America, where he earned a Licentiate of Canon Law in 1930.

Between 1930 and 1950, Cunningham served as secretary to Bishops Curley, John A. Duffy, and Walter Andrew Foery. The Vatican raised Cunningham to the rank of domestic prelate in 1941. He also served as an assistant at Loretto Rest Nursing Home and at St. John Church in Camden, New York. In 1946, Cunningham was named pastor of St. John the Baptist Parish in Syracuse and vicar general of the diocese.

=== Auxiliary Bishop of Syracuse ===
On April 5, 1950, Cunningham was appointed as auxiliary bishop of Syracuse and titular bishop of Lampsacus by Pope Pius XII. He received his episcopal consecration at the Cathedral of the Immaculate Conception in Syracuse on June 8, 1950, from Cardinal Francis Spellman, with Bishop Walter Foery and Archbishop Bryan Joseph McEntegart serving as co-consecrators. He was the first priest from the Diocese of Syracuse to be appointed a bishop. Cunningham attended all four sessions of the Second Vatican Council in Rome between 1962 and 1965.

=== Coadjutor Bishop and Bishop of Syracuse ===
Cunningham was named coadjutor bishop of Syracuse by Pope Paul VI on June 16, 1967 to assist Bishop Walter Foery in his duties. Foery appointed Cunningham as diocesan chancellor in 1969. Following Foery's retirement, Cunningham succeeded him as the sixth bishop of Syracuse on August 4, 1970.

=== Retirement ===
After reaching the mandatory retirement age of 75, Cunningham resigned as bishop of Syracuse on November 9, 1976. He died on February 22, 1979, at his residence in Syracuse, aged 78. He is buried at St. Mary's Cemetery in DeWitt.

Catholic Church titles
Preceded by Walter Andrew Foery	Bishop of Syracuse; 1970–1976	Succeeded by Francis James Harrison
