= Thomas Joseph Costello =

American Roman Catholic prelate (1929–2019)

His Excellency, The Most Reverend Thomas Joseph Costello
- Auxiliary Bishop of Syracuse; Titular Bishop of Perdices
- Archdiocese: New York
- Diocese: Syracuse
- Appointed: January 2, 1978
- Installed: March 18, 1978
- Term ended: March 23, 2004
- Other post: Titular Bishop of Perdices

Orders
- Ordination: June 5, 1954
- Consecration: March 18, 1978 by Francis James Harrison, David Frederick Cunningham, and Francis Mugavero

Personal details
- Born: February 23, 1929 Camden, New York
- Died: February 15, 2019 (aged 89)

Styles of Thomas Joseph Costello
- Reference style: His Excellency; The Most Reverend
- Spoken style: Your Excellency
- Religious style: Bishop

Thomas Joseph Costello (February 23, 1929 – February 15, 2019) was an American prelate of the Catholic Church who served as an auxiliary bishop of Roman Catholic Diocese of Syracuse.

Born in Camden, New York, Costello was ordained to the priesthood on June 5, 1954, at the Cathedral of the Immaculate Conception and served as a priest for 24 years before being consecrated a bishop on March 13, 1978. In addition to serving as auxiliary bishop of Syracuse, he was also named Titular Bishop of Perdices.

In the years before being elevated to bishop, Costello received the title of monsignor from Pope Paul VI in 1965.

He retired on March 23, 2004. He died on February 15, 2019.

== See also ==
- Catholic Church hierarchy
- Catholic Church in the United States
- Historical list of the Catholic bishops of the United States
- List of Catholic bishops of the United States
- Lists of patriarchs, archbishops, and bishops

Catholic Church titles
Preceded by -	Auxiliary Bishop of Syracuse; 1978-2004	Succeeded by -
