= Daniel Joseph Curley =

American Catholic Bishop of Syracuse

His Excellency, The Most Reverend Daniel Joseph Curley
- Bishop of Syracuse
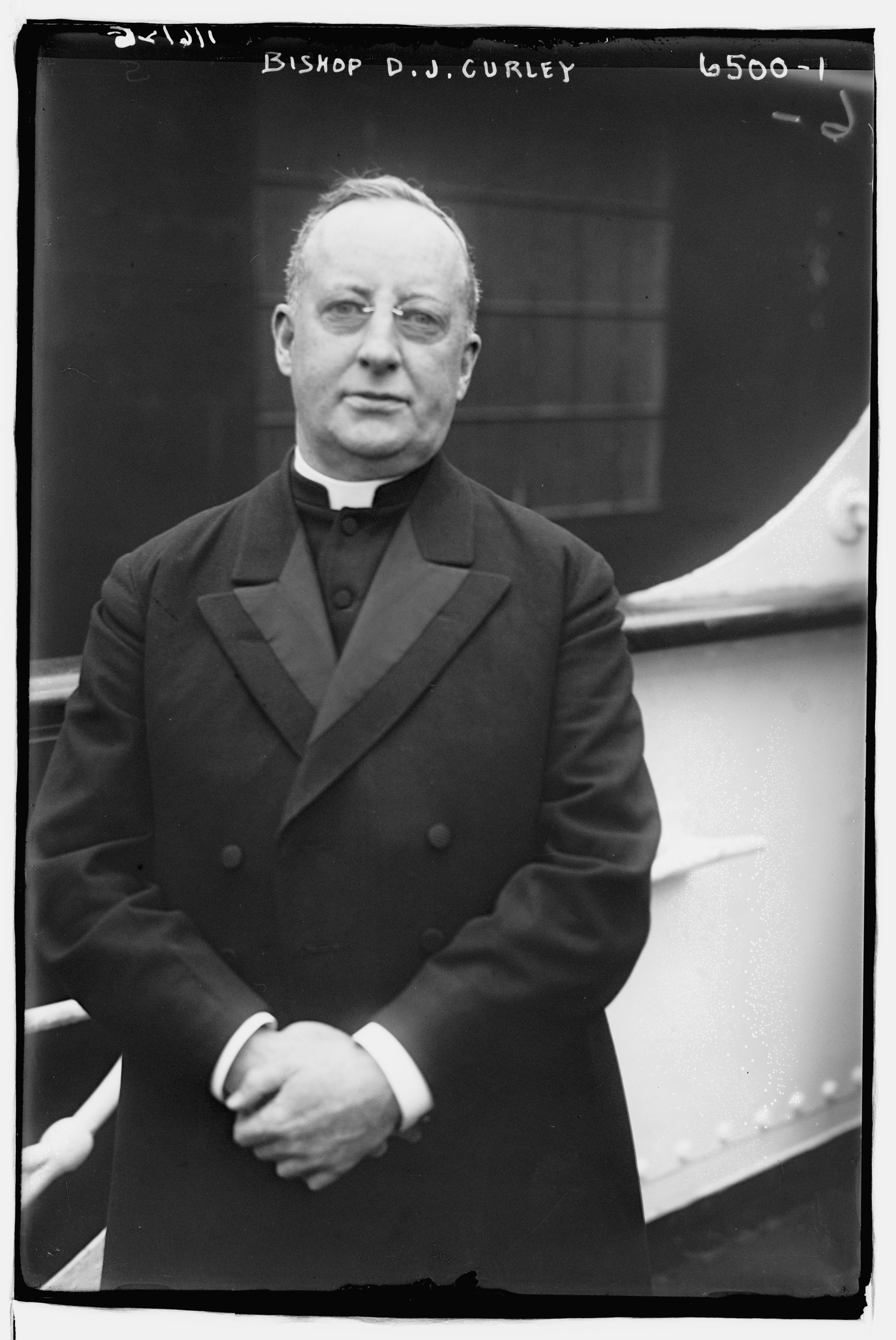
- Appointed: February 19, 1923
- Installed: 1923
- Term ended: 1932

Orders
- Ordination: May 19, 1894 by Lucido Maria Parocchi
- Consecration: May 1, 1923 by Patrick Joseph Hayes

Personal details
- Born: June 16, 1869 New York City, US
- Died: August 3, 1932 (aged 63) Syracuse, New York, US
- Buried: Cathedral of the Immaculate Conception
- Denomination: Roman Catholic
- Parents: Michael and Margaret (née Swan) Curley
- Education: St. Joseph's Seminary; St. Francis Xavier College

Daniel Joseph Curley (June 16, 1869 – August 3, 1932) was an American prelate of the Roman Catholic Church. He served as bishop of Syracuse in New York State from 1923 until his death in 1932.

== Biography ==
=== Early life ===
Daniel Curley was born on June 16, 1869, in New York City to Michael and Margaret (née Swan) Curley. He studied at St. Francis Xavier College in Queens and afterwards St. Joseph's Seminary in Troy, New York, While at St. Josephs, he befriended another seminarian, Patrick Joseph Hayes who would later become archbishop of New York. Curley furthered his studies at the Pontifical North American College in Rome.

=== Priesthood ===
Curley was ordained to the priesthood in Rome for the Archdiocese of New York by Cardinal Lucido Maria Parocchi on May 19, 1894.

Following his return to New York, he served as a curate at the Holy Name Parish in Manhattan. Archbishop Michael Corrigan named Curley as his secretary in 1901. The next year, Curley was named the founding pastor of Our Lady of Solace Parish in the Bronx. In 1921, Hayes suggested that the Vatican appoint Curley as an auxiliary bishop of New York.

=== Bishop of Syracuse ===
On February 19, 1923, Curley was appointed the third bishop of Syracuse by Pope Pius XI. He received his episcopal consecration on May 1, 1923 from Archbishop Hayes, with Bishops Edmund Gibbons and William Turner serving as co-consecrators, at St. Patrick's Cathedral in Manhattan. Edward Joseph Hanna, archbishop of San Francisco, preached the sermon.

During Curley's nine-year tenure in Syracuse, the Catholic population of the diocese increased from 173,200 to 201,152. He established a Society for the Propagation of the Faith, 28 parishes, 18 schools, Loretto Rest, and Our Lady of Lourdes Memorial Hospital in Binghamton, New York. At his invitation, the Sisters of Perpetual Rosary opened the first home for cloistered nuns in Syracuse.

One of Curley's final official acts was the approval of financing for a new parish in Lyncourt, New York. It was later named St. Daniel's Parish in his honor.

=== Death and legacy ===
Curley died from heart disease at age 63 in Syracuse, New York. He is buried in the crypt of the Cathedral of the Immaculate Conception.

Catholic Church titles
Preceded by John Grimes	Bishop of Syracuse; 1923–1932	Succeeded by John A. Duffy
