= Joseph Thomas O'Keefe =

Catholic bishop (1919–1997)

His Excellency, The Most Reverend Joseph Thomas O'Keefe
- Bishop of Syracuse
- In office: 1987-1995
- Predecessor: Francis James Harrison
- Successor: James Michael Moynihan

Orders
- Ordination: April 17, 1948 by Francis Spellman
- Consecration: September 8, 1982 by Terence Cooke

Personal details
- Born: March 12, 1919 New York City, New York, U.S.
- Died: September 2, 1997 (aged 78) Syracuse, New York, U.S.
- Denomination: Roman Catholic
- Parents: Michael and Bridget (née O'Sullivan) O'Keefe
- Motto: Adspice in Jesum (Look to Jesus)

Styles of Joseph Thomas O'Keefe
- Reference style: His Excellency; The Most Reverend
- Spoken style: Your Excellency
- Religious style: Bishop

Joseph Thomas O'Keefe (March 12, 1919 – September 2, 1997) was an American prelate of the Roman Catholic Church who served as bishop of the Diocese of Syracuse in New York from 1987 to 1995.

== Biography ==
=== Early life ===
Joseph O'Keefe was born on March 12, 1919 in New York City to Michael and Bridget (née O'Sullivan) O'Keefe.

=== Priesthood ===
O'Keefe was ordained to the priesthood for the Archdiocese of New York on April 17, 1948 at St. Patrick's Cathedral in Manhattan by Cardinal Francis Spellman. After his ordination, the archdiocese assigned O'Keefe as a curate at St. Luke's Parish in the Bronx. He also taught biology and served as dean at Cardinal Hayes High School in the same borough. In 1951, O'Keefe received a Master of Science degree in biology from the Catholic University of America in Washington, D.C.

O'Keefe later taught biology at Mercy College in Dobbs Ferry, New York and at St. Joseph Seminary in Yonkers, New York. He was secretary for education and associate superintendent of Catholic schools in the archdiocese, chancellor and vicar general, as well as pastor of St. John the Evangelist Parish in Manhattan.

=== Auxiliary Bishop of New York ===
On July 3, 1982, O'Keefe was appointed as an auxiliary bishop of New York and titular bishop of Tres Tabernae by Pope John Paul II. He received his episcopal consecration on September 8, 1982 from Cardinal Terence Cooke, with Archbishop John Joseph Maguire and Bishop Harold Robert Perry serving as co-consecrators, at St. Patrick's Cathedral.

After Cooke's death in 1983, the priests of the archdiocese elected O'Keefe to serve as the apostolic administrator, running the archdiocese until the pope appointed a new archbishop.

In 1986, O'Keefe had a public dispute with New York Governor Mario Cuomo over abortion rights for women. The archdiocese had recently banned public figures who supported abortion rights from speaking at archdiocesan properties. Cuomo said that while he personally did not believe in abortion rights, he supported the rights of women to make their own decisions on it. O'Keefe expressed his disagreement with Cuomo's position.

=== Bishop of Syracuse ===
John Paul II appointed O'Keefe as the eighth bishop of Syracuse on June 16, 1987. He was installed at the Cathedral of the Immaculate Conception in Syracuse on August 3, 1987.

=== Retirement and legacy ===
After reaching the mandatory retirement age of 75, O'Keefe resigned as bishop of Syracuse on April 4, 1995. He died from heart failure on September 2, 1997, at St. Joseph's Hospital Health Center in Syracuse at age 78.

Catholic Church titles
Preceded by Francis James Harrison	Bishop of Syracuse; 1987–1995	Succeeded by James Michael Moynihan
Preceded by –	Auxiliary Bishop of New York; 1982–1987	Succeeded by –
