= Bishop Grimes Junior/Senior High School =

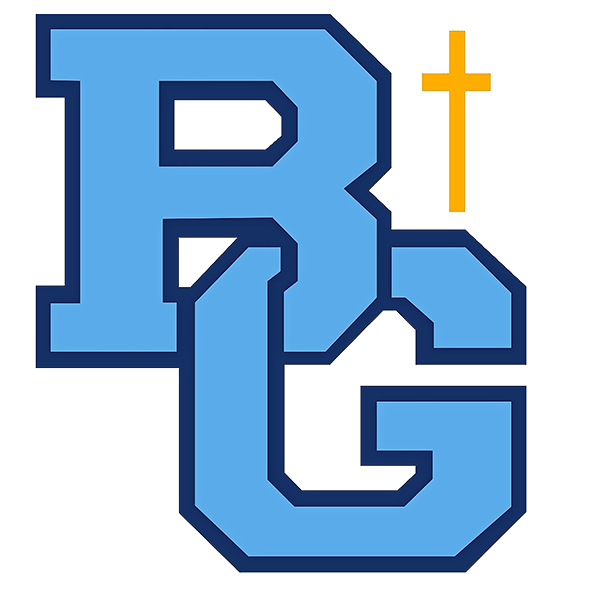

Location
- 6653 Kirkville Road; East Syracuse, (Onondaga County), New York 13057; United States; 43°4′41″N 76°3′38″W

Information
- Type: Catholic School, Coeducational
- Motto: Growing in the Maturity of Christ.
- Religious affiliation: Roman Catholic
- Established: 1966
- Closed: 2025
- Principal: Allyson Headd
- Principal: Patrick Kinne
- Faculty: 28.6 FTEs
- Grades: 7-12
- Enrollment: 282
- Student to teacher ratio: 12.3:1
- Colors: Light Blue, navy blue and white
- Song: Alma Mater Bishop Grimes
- Athletics: Robert McKenney
- Athletics conference: Onondaga High School League
- Mascot: Coby the Cobra
- Team name: Cobras
- Rival: Bishop Ludden
- Accreditation: Middle States Association of Colleges and Schools
- Yearbook: Twelfthtide
- Website: www.bishopgrimes.org

Bishop Grimes Junior/Senior High School was a private, Roman Catholic high school in East Syracuse, New York. It was located within the Roman Catholic Diocese of Syracuse. This school had more than 350 students in grades seven through twelve.

The school's closure was announced in early 2025. Bishop Grimes has now merged with Bishop Ludden to establish Bishop Ludden-Grimes Junior/Senior High School.

== History ==
Bishop Grimes Junior/Senior High School was established in 1966. It was named after the second bishop of Syracuse, John Grimes. During its inaugural years, the school was staffed by a combination of Marist Fathers, diocesan priests, the Sisters of St. Joseph of Carondelet, and lay teachers. Enrollment grew steadily through the late 1960s, peaking in the 1970s with a student body exceeding 1,000.

The school had students from almost every public school district in Onondaga County, and every Catholic parish in the Diocese of Syracuse. In 2005, they were in the Top 50 Catholic High Schools in the USA based on academics by the Cardinal Newman Society.

In February 2025, the Diocese of Syracuse announced that Bishop Grimes would be closed at the end of the 2024/2025 school year, and merged to Bishop Ludden Junior/Senior High School.

== Academics and student life ==
Bishop Grimes provided various academic and extracurricular programs. The school featured an on-site chapel, held monthly Masses, and incorporated Theology classes into its curriculum. Each grade level participated in spiritual retreats.

Students had access to 43 junior varsity, modified, and varsity sports teams. The school had two gymnasiums and an outdoor athletic field.

Language studies included courses in Spanish, with international travel through school-sponsored trips abroad. In the performing arts, students could enroll in band, chorus, and drama programs. The band department offered courses such as wind ensemble and music theory, along with extracurriculars like pep band and jazz band. The theater program produced annual musicals, with past musicals including Beauty and the Beast, Jekyll & Hyde, Shrek the Musical, Grease, The Addams Family, and Footloose.

Bishop Grimes provided Advanced Placement (AP) classes and exams such as: AP English Language and Composition, AP English Literature and Composition, AP Calculus AB and BC, AP Biology, AP Environmental Science, AP Psychology, AP World History, AP United States History, and AP Art and Design. In the past, they used to offer AP Computer Science Principles, AP Statistics, AP European History, AP Chemistry, AP Physics 1, and AP Physics C: Mechanics. They also partnered with Le Moyne College to offer access to the Le Moyne Pre-Collegiate Bridge Program. This program permitted students to take college courses for reduced tuition rates and provided reimbursement for up to five completed courses if students enrolled at Le Moyne. Additionally, students could use Le Moyne’s library, computing resources, career services, student support, and recreational facilities.

For students with individualized education plans (IEPs) or 504 plans, Bishop Grimes employed a full-time special education instructor. The Class of 2020 earned over $5 million in scholarships and financial awards.

Since September 2021, all enrolled students received an iPad, replacing the school’s previous use of Chromebooks.

Bishop Grimes had various clubs and extracurricular activities. Clubs included student government, yearbook & photography, drama & theater, ski & snowboard club, history bowl club, right to life club, and an international club.

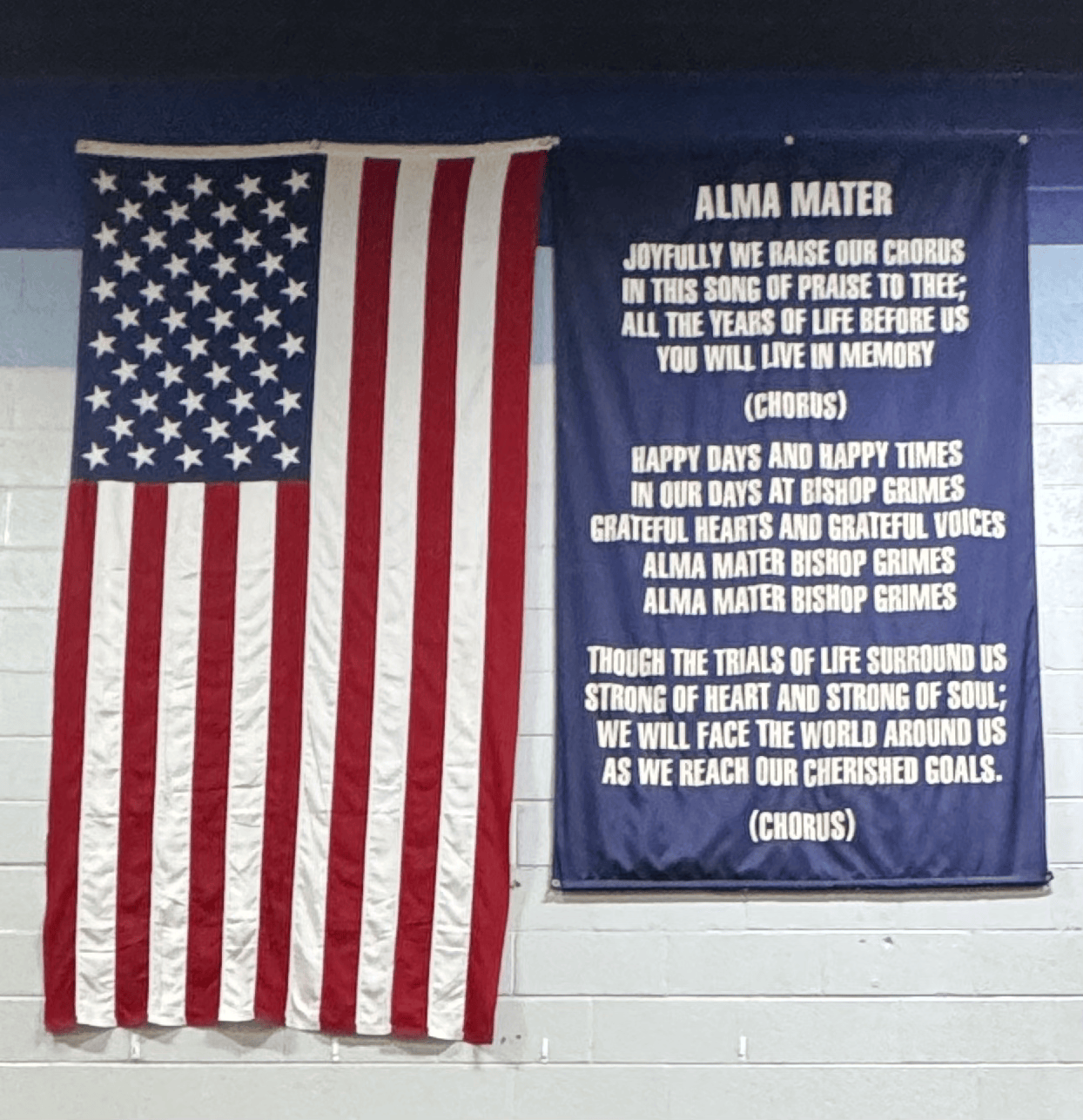
A banner displaying the Bishop Grimes alma mater hangs near the ceiling of the school gymnasium, alongside an American flag.

=== Graduation requirements ===
In order to graduate, students needed four credits for Theology, four credits for ELA, four credits for Social Studies, four credits for Mathematics, four credits for Science, four credits for a foreign language (Spanish or French; Grimes historically had French, German, Italian and Latin until the 2014-2015 year), one credit for Art/Music, two credits for P.E, 0.5 credits for Health, and 0.5 credits for Electives. In total, students needed at least 36 credits to graduate. Students could take honors classes starting in the 8th Grade.

== Demographics ==
As of the 2013–14 school year, the school had an enrollment of 353 students and 28.6 classroom teachers (on an FTE basis), for a student–teacher ratio of 12.3:1. The school's enrollment was 85.3% White, 10.2% Black, 1.1% Hispanic, 2.6% Asian and 0.9% American Indian / Alaska Native.

== Notable alumni ==
- Bob Antonacci, politician and judge
- Bobcat Goldthwait, actor, comedian, director, and screenwriter
- Tom Kenny, actor and comedian
- Chloe Webb, actress
- Linda M. LeMura, academic, president of Le Moyne College
