= Bishop Ludden Junior/Senior High School =

Private, coeducational school in Syracuse, New York, United States

Bishop Ludden-Grimes Junior/Senior High School

Location
- 815 Fay Road; Syracuse, NY; Syracuse, (Onondaga County), New York 13219; United States; 43°2′3″N 76°12′27″W

Information
- Type: Private, Coeducational
- Motto: Justitia et Pax (Justice and Peace)
- Religious affiliation: Catholic
- Established: 1963
- Closed: 2025
- School district: Diocese of Syracuse
- Superintendent: Amy Sansone
- Principal: Mary Beth Fierro
- Chaplain: Dennis Walker
- Staff: 20
- Faculty: 64
- Grades: 7-12
- Average class size: 15-25 students
- Student to teacher ratio: 15:1
- Colors: Green and White
- Slogan: Community - Faith - Excellence
- Athletics: Shaun Smith
- Athletics conference: OHSL
- Sports: Tennis (W), Volleyball (W), Soccer (M/W), Football (M), Basketball (M/W), Track (M/W), Cross Country (M/W), Softball (W), Baseball (M), Golf (M), Lacrosse (M/W),
- Mascot: Gaelic Knight
- Nickname: "Ludden"
- Rival: CBA
- Accreditation: Middle States Association of Colleges and Schools
- Yearbook: The Mitre
- Tuition: $5,300-$7,170
- Alumni: 7200+
- Website: www.bishopludden.org

Bishop Ludden-Grimes Junior/Senior High School was a private, Catholic high school in Syracuse, New York. It was located within the Roman Catholic Diocese of Syracuse.

== History ==
Bishop Ludden-Grimes Junior-Senior High School was founded in 1963 as a Catholic college preparatory high school for young men and women in the Western Region of the Syracuse Diocese. Chartered by the New York State Board of Regents, the school was a member of the Middle States Association of Colleges and Secondary Schools.

Bishop Ludden was named in honor of the first Bishop of the Diocese of Syracuse, Bishop Patrick Anthony Ludden.

In February 2025, the Diocese of Syracuse announced that Bishop Grimes Junior/Senior High School would be closed at the end of the 2024/2025 school year, and consolidate into one school, Bishop Ludden-Grimes Junior/Senior High School on the Bishop Ludden campus.

== About ==
Bishop Ludden Junior-Senior High School was an accredited International Baccalaureate (IB) World School, authorized to offer the IB Diploma Programme. The school offered IB courses, such as English Literature HL (Language A), History of the Americas HL, Psychology HL, Visual Arts HL, Math Analysis and Approaches SL, Biology SL, Environmental Systems and Societies SL, and French or Spanish SL (Language B).

In addition to its IB offerings, Bishop Ludden also provided several Advanced Placement (AP) courses, including AP Statistics, AP English Language and Composition, and AP Calculus AB.

The school participated in dual enrollment programs, including a Syracuse University Project Advance (SUPA) course in Esports and a partnership with Onondaga Community College that allowed students to take college courses with tuition waivers, though students were responsible for associated fees and textbooks.

Bishop Ludden offered science electives such as Introduction to Engineering, Forensic Science, Natural Hazards and Disasters, and Food Science.

World language instruction included Spanish and French. Historically, the school also offered Italian and Latin.

The school's architectural design was cruciform, with a central chapel located at the center of the building.

== Notable alumni ==
- Terry McAuliffe, former Democratic Party National Chairman, Governor of Virginia (2013-2017) — Class of 1975
- John Johnstone, Major League Baseball pitcher 1993–2000 — Class of 1987
- John Katko, Assistant U.S. Attorney, Member of The United States House of Representatives (2015 - 2023) - Class of 1980
- John Mannion, Member of The United States House of Representatives
- Robert Wood, engineer
