= Walter Andrew Foery =

American prelate

His Excellency, The Most Reverend Walter Andrew Foery
- Bishop of Syracuse; Titular Bishop of Berenice; Titular Bishop of Misenum
- Diocese: Syracuse
- Appointed: May 26, 1937
- Installed: August 18, 1937
- Predecessor: John Aloysius Duffy
- Successor: David Frederick Cunningham

Orders
- Ordination: June 10, 1916 by Thomas Francis Hickey
- Consecration: August 18, 1937 by Edward Mooney

Personal details
- Born: July 6, 1890 Rochester, New York, US
- Died: May 10, 1978 (aged 87) Rochester, New York
- Education: St. Bernard's Seminary
- Motto: State in fide (Stand in faith)

Styles of Walter Foery
- Reference style: The Most Reverend
- Spoken style: Your Excellency
- Religious style: Monsignor
- Posthumous style: none

Walter Andrew Foery (July 6, 1890 – May 10, 1978) was an American prelate of the Roman Catholic Church. He served as bishop of Syracuse in New York State from 1937 to 1970.

== Biography ==
=== Early life ===
Walter Foery was born on July 6, 1890, in Rochester, New York, to William and Agnes (née O'Brien) Foery. After attending St. Bridget's Grade School and St. Andrew's Preparatory Seminary, he studied at St. Bernard's Seminary in Rochester.

=== Priesthood ===
Foery was ordained to the priesthood by Archbishop Thomas Francis Hickey for the Diocese of Rochester on June 10, 1916 at St. Patrick's Cathedral in Rochester. After his ordination, the diocese assigned Foery as a curate of Our Lady of Mount Carmel Parish in Rochester. In 1922, he was named pastor of that parish. He was named director of the diocesan chapter Catholic Charities in 1930.

Foery left Our Lady in 1932 to serve as pastor of Holy Rosary Parish. He also served as vice-chair of the Rochester Council of Social Agencies, and represented the National Catholic Welfare Council at the Third International Conference on Social Welfare in London, England, in 1936.

=== Bishop of Syracuse ===
On May 26, 1937, Foery was appointed the fifth bishop of Syracuse by Pope Pius XI. He received his episcopal consecration on August 18, 1937, from Archbishop Edward Mooney, with Bishops Emmet M. Walsh and Francis Patrick Keough serving as co-consecrators. At age 46, he was the youngest bishop of Syracuse.

In 1945, Foery criticized as "unthinkable" the plan to leave out opening prayers at the United Nations Conference on International Organization Nations to be held in San Francisco, California, that year. In 1959, he expressed "shock and deep regret" that the Syracuse Metropolitan Health Council had admitted Planned Parenthood as a member. The Vatican named Foery as an assistant at the pontifical throne in 1961. He attended all four sessions of the Second Vatican Council in Rome between 1962 and 1965. In 1967, he joined the other Catholic bishops in New York to call Catholics to fight with "all their power" against efforts to liberalize state abortion law.

=== Retirement and death ===
Foery retired as bishop of Syracuse on August 4, 1970, after nearly thirty-three years of service. On that same date, he was named titular bishop of Misenum, a post which he resigned on December 31, 1870. Foery died in Rochester on May 10, 1978, at age 87, and is buried at St. Mary's Cemetery in DeWitt, New York.

Foery Hall, a residence hall at Le Moyne College in DeWitt, is named after Foery.

Catholic Church titles
Preceded by John Aloysius Duffy	Bishop of Syracuse; 1937–1970	Succeeded by David Frederick Cunningham
