= Seton Catholic Central =

Seton Catholic Central High School

Location
- 70 Seminary Avenue; Binghamton, (Broome County), NY 13905; United States; 42°5′54″N 75°55′42″W

Information
- Type: Private, Coeducational
- Religious affiliation: Roman Catholic
- Patron saints: Saint Elizabeth Ann Seton (primary), Saint Joseph (secondary)
- Established: 1963
- Local authority: 22
- Oversight: Roman Catholic Diocese of Syracuse
- School code: 18478245
- Ofsted: Reports
- President: Tracy Caezza
- Chairperson: Jon Sarra
- Principal: Peter Stewart
- Faculty: approx. 40
- Grades: 7-12
- Enrollment: approx. 385 (2013-14)
- Average class size: 20
- Student to teacher ratio: 10.0
- Colors: Green and White
- Fight song: Seton Catholic Central Alma Mater
- Athletics conference: STAC
- Team name: Saints
- Accreditation: Middle States Association of Colleges and Schools
- USNWR ranking: 14th of 100 Top Catholic Schools in New York State
- Yearbook: Reflections
- Tuition: $6,590
- Website: https://csbcsaints.org/our-schools/seton-catholic-central/

Seton Catholic Central is a private Roman Catholic school located on the Westside of Binghamton, New York. It is run by the Catholic Schools of Broome County, which is part of the Roman Catholic Diocese of Syracuse. The school was ranked 14 out of 100 of the best Catholic schools in New York State by Niche in 2016.

Both religious and laypeople compose Seton's full- and part-time staff, who are active in the extracurricular student life at Seton as coaches, advisers, and moderators.

The School embraces interscholastic athletics as an experience that is an integral part of their overall academic mission. Sportsmanship, teamwork, discipline, commitment, fitness, social interaction and healthy competition are the cornerstones of the athletic program. Every year, 80% of the student-body competes on at least one interscholastic athletic team. Seton offers 15 sports programs at the Varsity, J.V. and Modified levels. Teams have won 7 New York State Championships and 14 NYSPHSAA Regional Championships.

== School History ==
Seton Catholic Central was built in 1962 at 70 Seminary Ave in Binghamton and opened as Catholic Central High School in 1963. When the school merged as Seton Catholic Central High School in 1976, it housed students from both Catholic Central High School in Binghamton and Seton Catholic High School in Endicott, New York. The schools had to merge because of declining enrollments and a deficit. The Sisters of Charity, who staffed Seton, and the Sisters of St. Joseph, who staffed Catholic Central, were moved to the new school to be the main part of the faculty with Reverend VanAmburgh as the principal.

The class of 1977 was the first graduating class from Seton Catholic Central and had 281 members in it. Classes included math, science, English, foreign language (including Spanish), physical education, social studies, and business. Popular activities for students included chorus, newspaper, ski club, Marian Association, Key Club, mission club, pep club, bowling, and basketball.

In 2011, Seton Catholic Central High School became Seton Catholic Central when it opened its doors to students in 7th and 8th grades. Today Seton Catholic Central has students in grades 7- 12 and has approximately 355 students. The school offers many class options for all learning levels, as well as many sports and activities for all students. Students from all over the Binghamton area attend the school, as well as international students from places such as Germany, Italy and Asia.

== Curriculum and academics ==
Advanced Placement courses:

- Art History
- Biology
- Calculus AB
- Chemistry
- Computer Science
- Economics (Macro and Micro)
- English Language and Composition
- English Literature and Composition
- Environmental Science
- European History
- Latin
- Physics C: Mechanics
- Statistics
- Studio Art
- United States History
- World History

Honors level courses:

- English 2 Honors
- English 4 Honors
- Spanish 4 Honors

College credit courses:

- Spanish (The University of Albany)
- The Project Lead the Way Program (Rochester Institute of Technology)
- Forensic Science (Broome Community College)
- AP Chemistry (Broome Community College)

2016-17 Advanced Placement data:

- In the 2016–2017 school year, 95 Seton Catholic Central students in grades 10-12 took 206 AP exams in 19 subject areas
- 74.3% of the scores were 3 and above
- 43.2% of the scores were 4 and above
- In 2017, SCC had 14 AP Scholars, 8 AP Scholars with Honors, 13 AP Scholars with Distinction and 3 National AP Scholars.

2016 graduation data:

- 16% Regents Diploma
- 64% Regents Diploma with Advanced Designation
- 20% Regents Diploma with Advanced Designation with Honors
- 7% earned a GPA of 100-103
- 21% earned a GPA of 95-99
- ACT College Readiness Measures: 77% meet or exceed all four benchmarks vs 48% statewide

== Student life ==
On March 23, 2017, the Seton Catholic Central Student Council ratified an updated Student Body Constitution pertaining to student government and elections, student organization, club chartering, and Catholic service. The school students and its administrators chose to adopt a House System of five separate Houses consisting of roughly 75 students of all grade levels. The five Houses are each headed by a Senior Class Perfect as well as a Faculty Advisor. The Class Boards, responsible for facilitating class service projects, events, dances, Proms, or fundraisers, are composed of five classmates from separate Houses. Houses meet on a bi-weekly schedule to plan student activities and Catholic Service Projects.

Seton Catholic Central Houses:

- House of St. Catherine of Alexandria
- House of Pope St. Gregory the Great
- House of St. Ignatius of Loyola
- House of St. John Neumann
- House of St. Philomena

There are a large number of extracurricular student groups at Seton Catholic Central, under the direction of the Student Council which is composed of: an executive board and officers for each class. The school also has chapters of the National Honor Society, which was chartered on August 18, 1979, and Key Club International, which was rechartered on March 7, 2016.

High School Clubs:

- Academic Challenge
- Chinese Board Game Club
- Creative Writing Club
- History Club
- Key Club
- Mathletes
- Mock Trial
- Political Leaders of Tomorrow
- Robotics
- Science Olympiad
- Seton Speaks
- S.M.I.L.E Club
- Spanish Club
- Sustainability Club
- Ukulele Club
- Yes! Leads

Athletics record:

- 112 STAC Divisional Championships
- 21 STAC Conference Championships
- 84 Section IV Championships
- 14 NYSPHSAA Regional Championships
- 7 STATE CHAMPIONSHIPS

Sports teams:

- Boys’ Modified/Varsity Football
- Boys’ Modified/JV/Varsity Soccer
- Boys’ Varsity Golf
- Boys’ Modified/JV/Varsity Basketball
- Boys’ Modified/JV/Varsity Baseball
- Boys’ Modified/Varsity Laccrose
- Boys’ Varsity Tennis
- Girls’ Modified/Varsity Tennis
- Girls’ Modified/Varsity Soccer
- Girls’ Modified/JV/Varsity Basketball
- Girls’ Modified/Varsity Softball
- Girls’ Modified/Varsity Lacrosse
- Girls’ JV/Varsity Cheerleading
- Boys and Girls’ Modified/Varsity Cross Country
- Boys and Girls’ Varsity Swimming and Diving
- Boys and Girls’ Modified/Varsity Track and Field

== Alma mater and official school prayer ==
The Seton Catholic Central Alma Mater was written by Sister Mary Ellen Hogan, C.S.J. and is sung at every Varsity Boys' Basketball home game by the Stage Band and by students at other school athletic events.

The Seton Catholic Central High School Prayer of St. Elizabeth Ann Seton was written using excerpts and quotations from Mother Seton's writings.
