= Francis James Harrison =

Catholic bishop (1912–2004)

His Excellency, The Most Reverend Francis James Harrison
- Bishop of Syracuse; Titular Bishop of Aquae in Numidia
- In office: 1977–1987
- Previous post: Auxiliary Bishop of Syracuse (1971 to 1977)

Orders
- Ordination: June 4, 1937 by Edward Aloysius Mooney
- Consecration: April 22, 1971 by David Frederick Cunningham

Personal details
- Born: August 20, 1912 Syracuse, New York, US
- Died: May 1, 2004 (aged 91) Syracuse, New York
- Buried: St. Agnes Cemetery, Syracuse
- Denomination: Roman Catholic
- Parents: Francis and Mary (née Flynn) Harrison
- Education: University of Notre Dame; St. Bernard's Seminary
- Motto: Unity in Christ

Styles of Francis James Harrison
- Reference style: His Excellency; The Most Reverend
- Spoken style: Your Excellency
- Religious style: Bishop

Francis James Harrison (August 20, 1912 – May 1, 2004) was an American prelate of the Roman Catholic Church. He served as bishop of Syracuse in New York State from 1977 to 1987.

== Biography ==
=== Early life ===
One of six children, Francis Harrison was born in Syracuse, New York, to Francis and Mary (née Flynn) Harrison. He graduated in 1929 from St. Lucy Academy in Syracuse, where he was elected class president and later named valedictorian. Harrison then attended the University of Notre Dame in Indiana, where he played varsity baseball, Deciding to become a priest, he entered St. Bernard's Seminary in Rochester, New York, in 1931.

=== Priesthood ===
Harrison was ordained to the priesthood on June 4, 1937, at St. Patrick's Cathedral in Rochester for the Diocese of Syracuse by Cardinal Edward Aloysius Mooney. After his ordination, the diocese assigned Harrison as a curate at Our Lady of Mount Carmel Parish in Utica, New York, St. Mary of the Assumption Parish in Binghamton, New York, and the Cathedral of the Immaculate Conception Parish in Syracuse. He also served as assistant director of Utica Catholic Charities. The diocese appointed Harrison as the founding pastor of St. Andrew the Apostle Parish in Syracuse; then transferred him to St. Patrick Parish in Binghamton and later St. James Parish in Syracuse.

=== Auxiliary Bishop of Syracuse ===
On March 1, 1971, Harrison was appointed auxiliary bishop of Syracuse and titular bishop of Aquae in Numidia by Pope Paul VI. He received his episcopal consecration at the Cathedral of the Immaculate Conception on April 22, 1971, from Bishop David Frederick Cunningham, with Bishops Stanislaus Joseph Brzana and Joseph Lloyd Hogan serving as co-consecrators.

=== Bishop of Syracuse ===
Following Cunningham's resignation, Paul VI named Harrison as the seventh bishop of Syracuse on November 9, 1976. Harrison was installed at the Cathedral of the Immaculate Conception on February 6, 1977. He was the first Syracuse native to head the diocese.

Harrison practiced a collegial manner of governing, and worked to include laity and especially women in the diocesan affairs. He launched diocesan programs for African Americans, Hispanics, Native Americans, and the disabled. He once played golf with the comedian Bob Hope, who later recorded a radio ad for the diocese's first HOPE Appeal, an annual fundraiser Harrison started in 1978.

In 1980, Harrison called for the United States to cease its military aid to El Salvador following the rape and murder of four American missionaries by the national guard of that nation. He declared, "As Christians and as Americans, we cannot condone our resources and our tax dollars being used to help any foreign government repress its own people so brutally." He later expressed his opposition to American military aid for the Contra rebels who found against the Government of Nicaragua during the 1980s.

=== Resignation and death ===
Shortly before reaching the mandatory retirement age of 75, Harrison resigned as bishop of Syracuse on June 16, 1987. Harrison died on May 1, 2004, at St. Camillus Health and Rehabilitation Center in Syracuse at age 91. He is buried at the St. Agnes Cemetery in Syracuse.

Catholic Church titles
Preceded by David Frederick Cunningham	Bishop of Syracuse; 1977–1987	Succeeded by Joseph Thomas O'Keefe
