= James Michael Moynihan =

Catholic bishop

His Excellency, The Most Reverend James Michael Moynihan
- Bishop of Syracuse
- In office: 1995 to 2009
- Predecessor: Joseph Thomas O'Keefe
- Successor: Robert Joseph Cunningham

Orders
- Ordination: December 15, 1957 by Martin John O'Connor
- Consecration: May 29, 1995 by John O’Connor

Personal details
- Born: July 6, 1932 Rochester, New York, US
- Died: March 6, 2017 (aged 84) Jamesville, New York, US
- Denomination: Roman Catholic
- Education: St. Bernard Seminary College; Pontifical Gregorian University
- Motto: Support one another in love

Styles of James Moynihan
- Reference style: The Most Reverend
- Spoken style: Your Excellency
- Religious style: Bishop
- Posthumous style: not applicable

James Michael Moynihan (July 6, 1932 – March 6, 2017) was an American prelate of the Roman Catholic Church. He served as the ninth bishop of Syracuse in New York State from 1995 to 2009.

== Biography ==
=== Early life ===
James Moynihan was born on July 6, 1932, in Rochester, New York, to Michael Joseph and Carolyn Elizabeth (née Horigan) Moynihan; he had one sister, Carol Anne. He graduated Nazareth Hall School for Boys in Rochester in 1946. Deciding to become a priest, Moynihan enrolled at St. Andrew's Seminary High School in Rochester. After his high school graduation in 1950, Moynihan entered St. Bernard Seminary College, graduating in 1954 with his Bachelor of Arts degree. Moynihan then traveled to Rome to continue his studies for the priesthood.

=== Priesthood ===
Moynihan was ordained to the priesthood for the Diocese of Rochester by Archbishop Martin O'Connor on December 15, 1957, at the chapel of the Pontifical North American College in Rome.While in Rome, he received a Licentiate in Theology from the North American College and a Doctor of Canon Law degree summa cum laude from the Pontifical Gregorian University.

After returning to the United States, the diocese in 1961 assigned Moynihan as an associate pastor at Our Lady of Mt. Carmel Parish in Rochester. That same year, he was named as defender of the bond and promoter of justice in the diocesan tribunal. In 1962, Moynihan was also assigned as a chaplain to the Monroe County Detention Center in Rochester and the Rochester Police Department. Moynihan left Our Lady in 1962 after Bishop James Kearney named him as his secretary.

Kearney named Moynihan as vice-chancellor of the diocese in 1965. He moved up to the role of chancellor in 1967. In 1974, he began serving as chaplain of Highland Hospital in Rochester. Two years later, the diocese assigned Moynihan as pastor of St. Joseph's Parish in Penfield, New York, until 1991 .In addition to his other duties, he served as director of the Bishop's Annual Catholic Thanksgiving Appeal from 1985 to 1989.

In 1991, after 15 years at St. Joseph, Moynihan moved to New York City to serve as associate secretary general of the Catholic Near East Welfare Association. One of his accomplishments there was to successfully register the Association with the U.S. Agency for International Development. The Vatican raised Moynihan to the rank of chaplain to his holiness in 1993.

=== Bishop of Syracuse ===
On April 4, 1995, Moynihan was appointed the ninth bishop of Syracuse by Pope John Paul II. He received his episcopal consecration at the Cathedral of the Immaculate Conception in Syracuse, New York, on May 29, 1995, from Cardinal John O’Connor, with Bishops Joseph O'Keefe and Matthew Clark serving as co-consecrators.

In 1998, Moynihan dropped the syndicated column of Reverend Richard McBrien from the diocesan newspaper. A theologian from the University of Notre Dame, O'Brien was part of the liberal wing of the American Catholic Church. Moynihan replace his column with one by George Weigel, a conservative Catholic .In protest, 54 diocesan priest signed a letter to Moynihan requesting a meeting about it. In November 2001 he released a pastoral letter entitled: Equipping the Saints for the Work of Ministry.Moynihan was a founding member of the Bishop Sheen Ecumenical Housing Foundation, which assisted needy homeowners in the rural areas of the diocese.

=== Retirement and death ===
Moynihan retired as bishop of Syracuse on May 26, 2009. He was succeeded by Bishop Robert J. Cunningham. Moynihan died in Jamesville, New York, on March 6, 2017, at the age of 84.

Catholic Church titles
Preceded by Joseph Thomas O'Keefe	Bishop of Syracuse; 1995–2009	Succeeded by Robert Joseph Cunningham
