= Gouverneur Correctional Facility =

Medium-security state prison for men located in New York, US

Coordinates: 44°20′24″N 75°26′32″W

- Interactive map of Gouverneur Correctional Facility
- Location: 112 Scotch Settlement Road Gouverneur, New York
- Status: open
- Security class: medium
- Capacity: 800
- Opened: 1990
- Managed by: New York State Department of Corrections and Community Supervision

The Gouverneur Correctional Facility is a medium-security state prison for men located in Gouverneur, St. Lawrence County, New York, owned and operated by the New York State Department of Corrections and Community Supervision. The facility has a working capacity of 1075 inmates held at medium security. By October 2013, the number of inmates had decreased to 800, overseen by 367 employees.
