= John Grimes (bishop of Syracuse) =

Irish-born prelate

His Excellency, The Right Reverend John Grimes
- Bishop of Syracuse; Titular Bishop of Hermeria
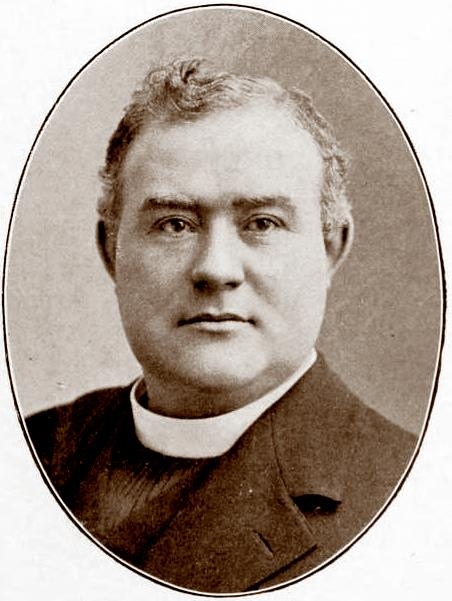
- See: Diocese of Syracuse
- In office: 1912-1922
- Predecessor: Patrick Anthony Ludden
- Successor: Daniel Joseph Curley
- Previous post: Coadjutor Bishop of Syracuse (1909 to 1912)

Orders
- Ordination: February 19, 1882 by Francis McNeirny
- Consecration: May 16, 1910 by John Murphy Farley

Personal details
- Born: December 18, 1852 County Limerick, Ireland
- Died: July 26, 1922 (aged 69) Syracuse, New York, US
- Denomination: Catholic
- Parents: John and Bridget (née Hammon) Grimes
- Education: College of Saint-Hyacinthe; Grand Seminary of Montreal
- Motto: Monstra te esse matrem (Show yourself to be our mother)

John Grimes (December 18, 1852 – July 26, 1922) was an Irish-born prelate of the Roman Catholic Church. He served as bishop of Syracuse in New York State from 1912 until his death in 1922. He previously served as coadjutor bishop of Syracuse from 1909 to 1912.

== Biography ==
=== Early life ===
John Grimes was born on December 18, 1852, in County Limerick in the United Kingdom of Britain and Ireland to John and Bridget (née Hammon) Grimes. He was educated at both a national school and a Jesuit college in Ireland before going to Canada, where he enrolled at the College of Saint-Hyacinthe in Saint-Hyacinthe, Quebec, in 1874.

In 1878, Bishop Francis McNierney of the Diocese of Albany in New York State paid for Grimes to study for the priesthood at the Grand Seminary of Montreal in Montreal, Quebec, in 1878.

=== Priesthood ===
Grimes was ordained to the priesthood in Albany for the Diocese of Syracuse by McNeirny on February 19, 1882. After his ordination, the diocese assigned Grimes as a curate at St. Mary's Parish in Syracuse. In 1887, he was named pastor of St. Paul's Parish in Whitesboro, New York. In 1890, Grimes returned to St. Mary's as its pastor.

=== Coadjutor Bishop and Bishop of Syracuse ===
On February 1, 1909, Grimes was appointed as coadjutor bishop of Syracuse and titular bishop of Hermeria by Pope Pius X to assist Bishop Patrick Anthony Ludden in his duties.Grimes received his episcopal consecration on May 16, 1909, at the Cathedral of the Immaculate Conception in Syracuse from Archbishop John Farley, with Ludden and Bishop Thomas Burke serving as co-consecrators.

Upon Ludden's death on August 6, 1912, Grimes automatically succeeded him as the second bishop of Syracuse.

=== Death and legacy ===
John Grimes died in Syracuse on July 26, 1922, at age 69. The funeral was presided over by Patrick Joseph Hayes, archbishop of New York, during which city courts adjourned for one hour.

A Catholic high school, Bishop Grimes Junior/Senior High School in East Syracuse, New York, was named in 1960 after him.

Catholic Church titles
Preceded by Patrick Anthony Ludden	Bishop of Syracuse; 1912–1922	Succeeded by Daniel Joseph Curley
