= Douglas Lucia =

American Catholic prelate (born 1963)

His Excellency, The Most Reverend Douglas Lucia
- Bishop of Syracuse
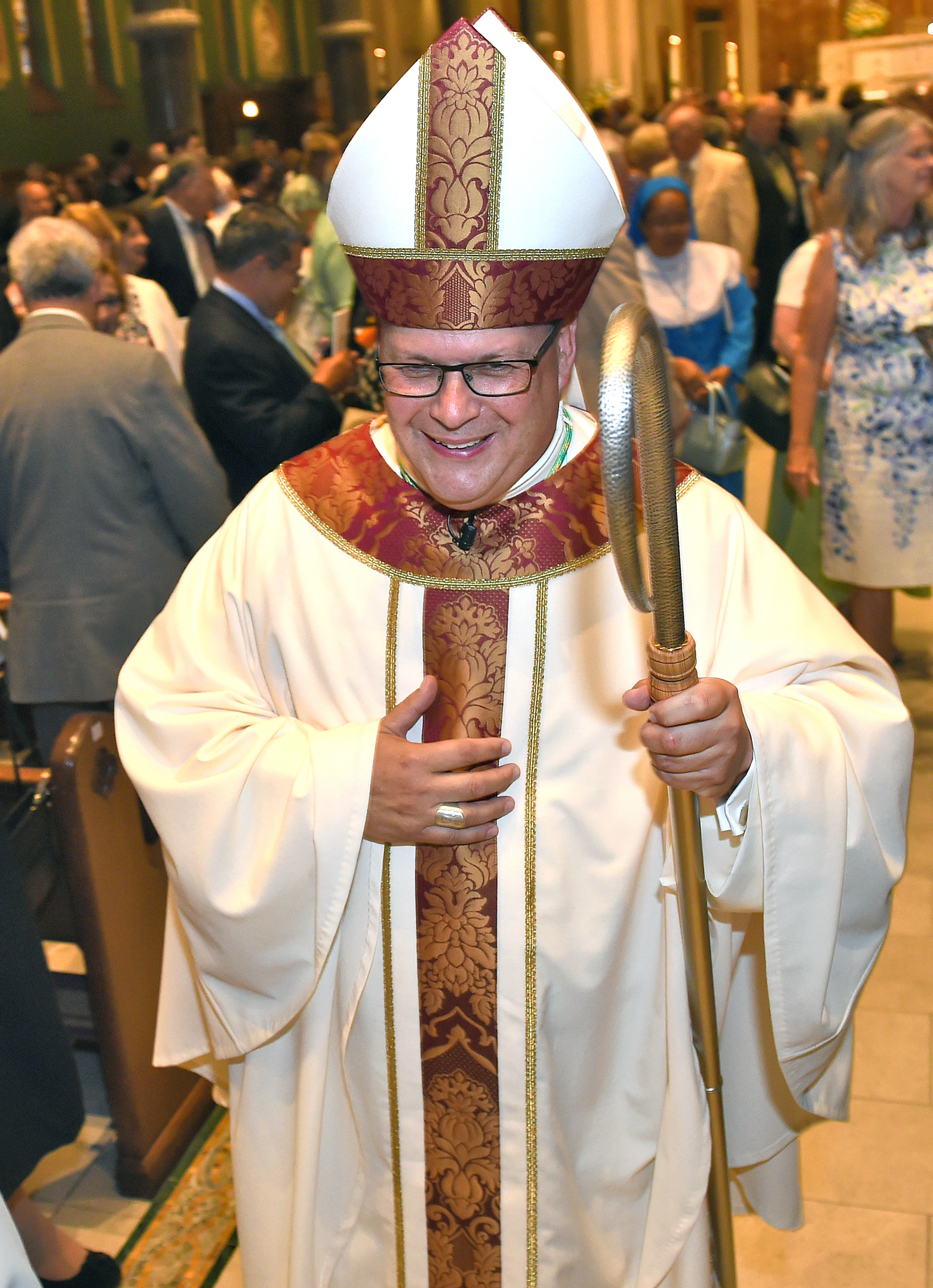
- Lucia in 2019
- Archdiocese: New York
- Diocese: Syracuse
- Appointed: June 4, 2019
- Installed: August 8, 2019
- Predecessor: Robert J. Cunningham

Orders
- Ordination: May 20, 1989 by Stanislaus Joseph Brzana
- Consecration: August 8, 2019 by Timothy M. Dolan, Robert J. Cunningham, and Terry R. LaValley

Personal details
- Born: March 17, 1963 (age 63) Plattsburgh, New York
- Motto: In the Name of Jesus

Styles of Douglas Lucia
- Reference style: His Excellency; The Most Reverend
- Spoken style: Your Excellency
- Religious style: Bishop

Douglas John Lucia (born March 17, 1963) is an American Catholic prelate who serves as bishop of Syracuse in New York State.

== Biography ==
=== Early life ===
Lucia was born on March 17, 1963, in Plattsburgh, New York, to Leward and Betty (Pepin) Lucia. After deciding to become a priest, Lucia entered Wadhams Hall Seminary College in Ogdensburg, New York, where he received a Bachelor of Arts in 1985.

He continued his priestly formation at Christ the King Seminary in East Aurora, New York, receiving a Master of Divinity degree in 1989.

=== Priesthood ===
Lucia was ordained a priest at St. Mary's Cathedral in Ogdensburg by Bishop Stanislaus Joseph Brzana for the Diocese of Ogdensburg on May 20, 1989. After his ordination, the diocese assigned Lucia as parochial vicar at the following parishes:

- St. Patrick's in Watertown, New York (1989 to 1990)
- St. Columban's in Cornwall, Ontario, in the Diocese of Alexandria-Cornwall (1990 to 1992)
- St. John the Baptist in Plattsburgh, New York (1992 to 1995)
- St. Mary's Cathedral (1995 to 1997). He was also named as assistant secretary to the marriage tribunal in 1995.

In 1997, Lucia traveled to Rome to study at the Pontifical University of St. Thomas Aquinas. After Lucia came back to Ogdensburg in 1999, Brzana named him adjutant judicial vicar and vice chancellor of the diocese. He also became administrator of St. Raphael's Parish in Heuvelton, New York, and worked part-time as a chaplain at the Gouverneur Correctional Facility in Gouverneur, New York.

In 2000, Bishop Gerald Barbarito named Lucia as his priest-secretary and in 2003 as director of vocations. Bishop Robert J. Cunningham named Lucia as chancellor in 2004, along with episcopal vicar for diocesan services. In 2017, Lucia became pastor of St. Mary's Parish in Waddington, New York, and St. John the Baptist Parish in Madrid, New York.

Lucia coached youth ice hockey teams before moving to Syracuse.

=== Bishop of Syracuse ===
Pope Francis named Lucia to succeed Cunningham as bishop of Syracuse on June 4, 2019. On August 8, 2019, Lucia was ordained by Cardinal Timothy Dolan, with Bishops Terry R. LaValley and Cunningham serving as co-consecrators.

In June 2020, Lucia announced that the diocese would file for Chapter 11 bankruptcy protection. It was facing more than 100 alleged victims of sexual abuse. Lucia stated that he wanted to ensure that all the alleged victims received some compensation, rather than a few receiving the majority of the compensation before the later victims were able to have their chance, although one lawyer, Jeff Anderson (whose law firm would stand to gain the most financially by continued individual legislation), said that the diocese was seeking to avoid the lawsuits.

In July 2021, Lucia indicated that he would request that the Vatican repudiate the Doctrine of Discovery, a series of papal bulls from the 15th century that legitimized the subjugation of indigenous populations in the Americas by Catholic European powers. In March 2023, the Dicastery for Culture and Education and the Dicastery for Promoting Integral Human Development formally repudiated the doctrine.

Catholic Church titles
Preceded by Robert J. Cunningham	Bishop of Syracuse; 2019–present	Succeeded by Incumbent
