= William Turner (bishop of Buffalo) =

Irish-born prelate

His Excellency, The Most Reverend William Turner
- Bishop of Buffalo
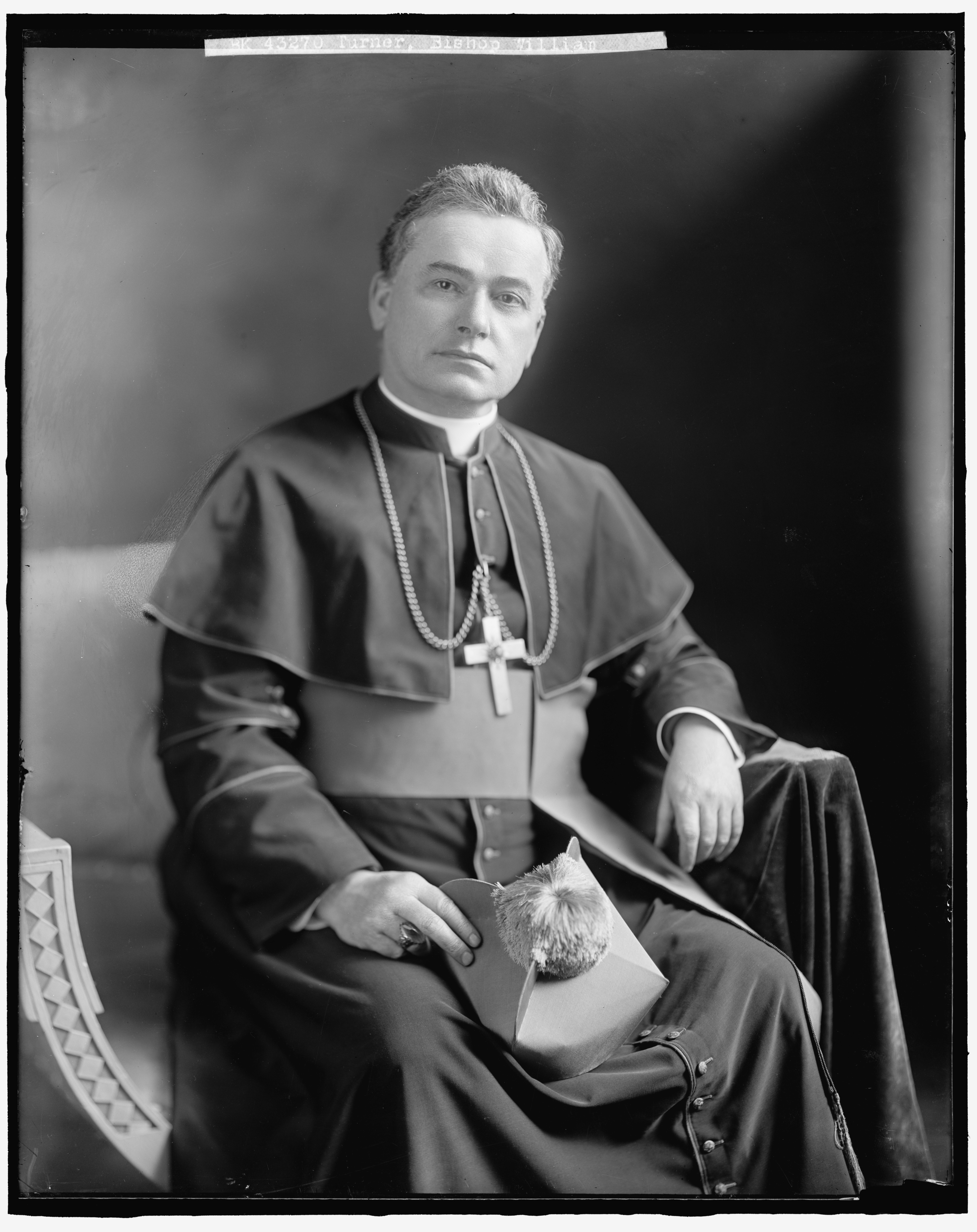
- Diocese: Buffalo
- Installed: 1919
- Term ended: 1936
- Predecessor: Dennis Joseph Dougherty
- Successor: John Aloysius Duffy

Orders
- Ordination: August 13, 1893
- Consecration: March 30, 1919 by James Gibbons

Personal details
- Born: April 8, 1871 Kilmallock, County Limerick, Ireland
- Died: July 10, 1936 (aged 65) Buffalo, New York, US
- Denomination: Roman Catholic
- Education: Mungret College; Royal University of Ireland; Propaganda College; Institut Catholique de Paris
- Motto: Dominus regit me (The Lord rules me)

Styles of William Turner
- Reference style: The Most Reverend
- Spoken style: Your Excellency
- Religious style: Monsignor
- Posthumous style: none

William Turner (April 8, 1871 – July 10, 1936) was an Irish-born prelate of the Roman Catholic Church who served as bishop of the Diocese of Buffalo in New York State from 1919 until his death in 1936.

He was ordained in 1893, and spent his early years as a priest teaching in various institutions. Upon his appointment as bishop of Buffalo he was occupied with pastoral duties in a very large diocese.

== Biography ==
=== Early life ===
William Turner was born on April 8, 1871, at Kilmallock, Ireland. His brother John Turner later became a priest. William Turner received his education at Mungret College in Limerick, the Royal University of Ireland, the Propaganda College in Rome, and the Institut Catholique de Paris.

=== Priesthood ===
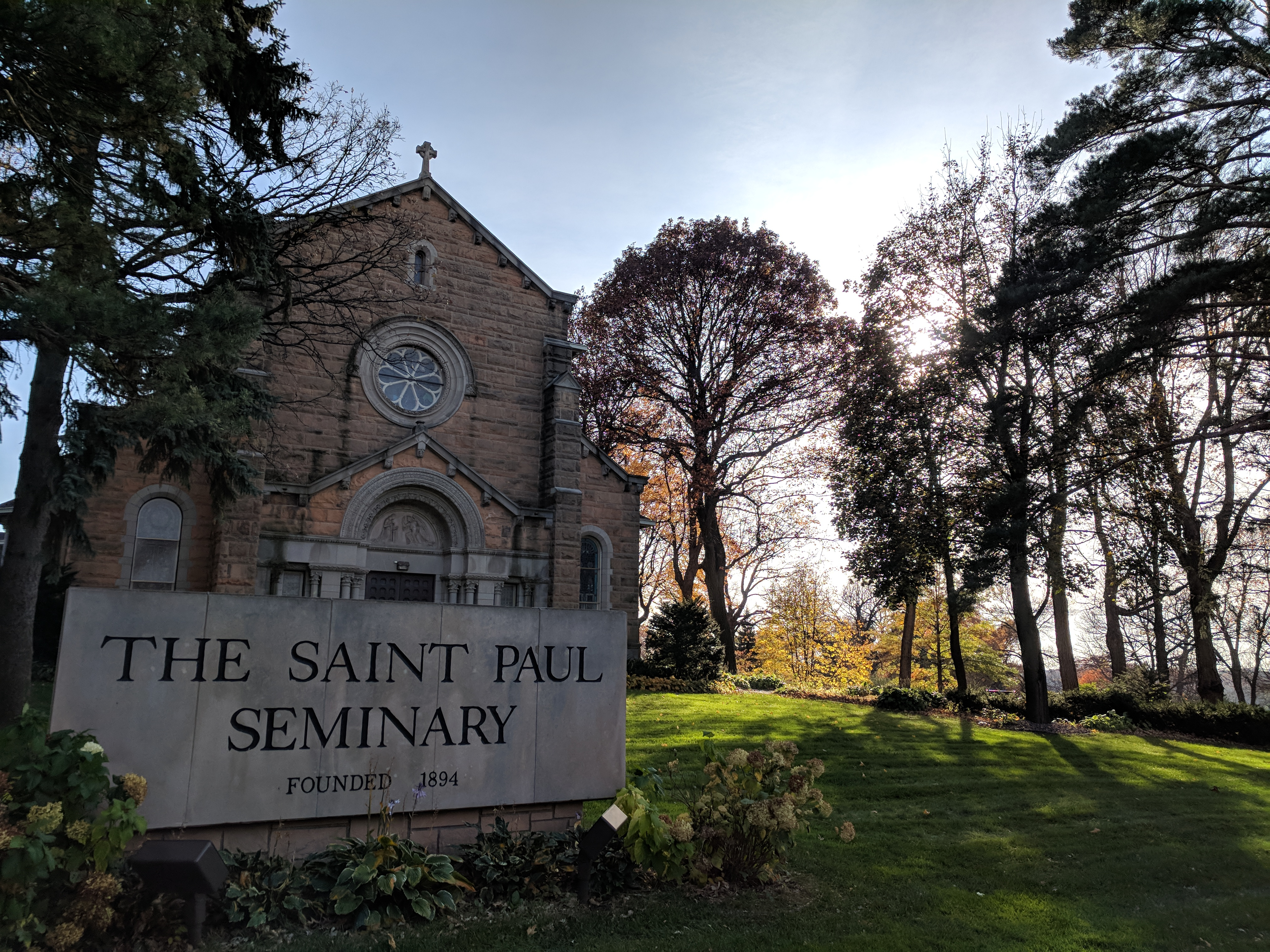
Saint Paul Seminary School of Divinity, St. Paul, Minnesota (2017)

Turner was ordained to the priesthood in Rome on August 13, 1893 by Cardinal Lucido Maria Parocchi. That same year, Turner was awarded the Benemerenti medal for an analysis of Commentary on Aristotle's De Anima by the theologian Thomas Aquinas.

In 1894, he began teaching Latin and logic at the College of St. Thomas in St. Paul, Minnesota, moving to St. Paul's Seminary in St. Paul in 1895. He served as rector of St. Luke's Parish in St. Paul. He later moved to Washington D.C. to serve as a librarian and professor of philosophy at the Catholic University of America.

=== Bishop of Buffalo ===
On March 10, 1919, Turner was appointed the sixth bishop of Buffalo by Pope Benedict XV. He received his episcopal consecration in Washington at the Franciscan Monastery of the Holy Land on March 30, 1919, from Cardinal James Gibbons, with Bishops Denis J. O'Connell and Michael Curley serving as co-consecrators.

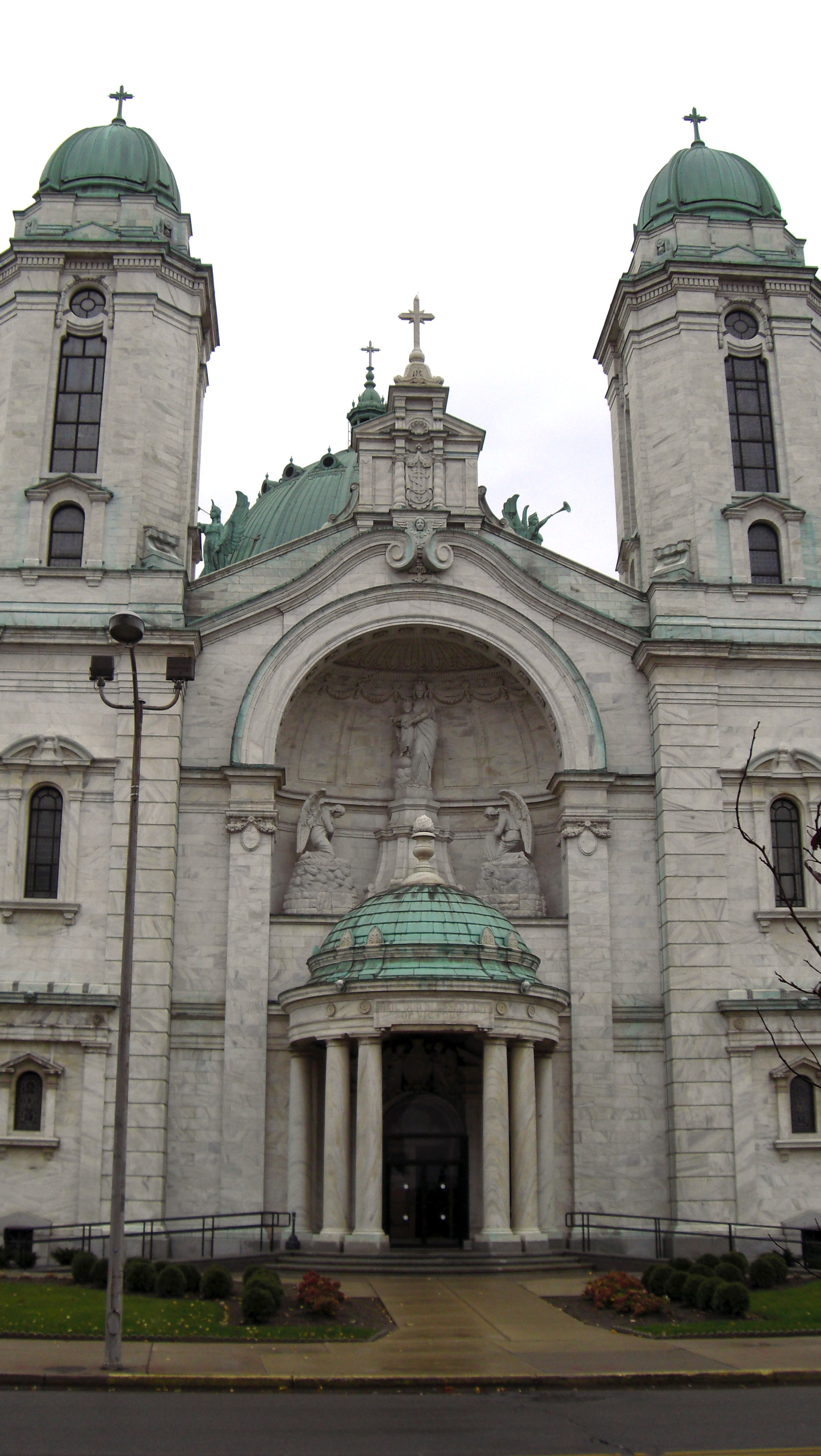
Our Lady of Victory Church, Lackawanna, New York (2008)

In 1919, Turner consecrated the Church of St. Mary of the Angels in Olean, New York. In August 1922, Turner helped lay the cornerstone of the Basilica of Our Lady of Victory in Lackawanna, New York. Turner was a supporter of the Society of Saint Vincent de Paul, and in 1924 began a chapter of Catholic Charities in the diocese.

In 1926, Turner blessed the Father Millet Cross in Lewiston, New York. It honored Reverend Pierre Millet, a French missionary who ministered to the peoples of the Iroquois Confederacy during the 17th century. At the dedication ceremony, Turner gave credit,

"...not only to Father Millet, but to those other priests whose heroism took Christianity into the wilderness and whose devotion sought to create in this new world a new France."

In 1930, William Turner celebrated the feast of the recently canonized North American Martyrs with a solemn pontifical high mass at the Church of Saint Vincent de Paul in Buffalo. Four days later he laid the cornerstone for the Lyceum at St. John Kanty Parish in Buffalo, where “...at least 90% of the people were Catholics, but only about a third practiced their religion.”

He established more than 30 new parishes during his administration, including national parishes such as Our Lady of Czestochowa for Polish Catholics in North Tonawanda, New York.

=== Death ===
William Turner died in Buffalo on July 10, 1956, at age 65. He was buried at Mount Olivet Cemetery in Tonawanda, New York. A Celtic cross marks his grave. The former Bishop Turner High School in Buffalo was named after him. Built in 1960, the school closed in 2003.

== Works ==
Turner was a contributor to the Catholic Encyclopedia, the American Catholic Quarterly Review, Catholic World, American Ecclesiastical Review, America, the Philosophical Review, Journal of Philosophy, and the Irish Theological Quarterly; and was editor of the Catholic University Bulletin.

- History of Philosophy, 1903
- Storia della filosofia (translated) 1904
- Lessons in Logic, 1911

Catholic Church titles
Preceded by Dennis Joseph Dougherty	Bishop of Buffalo; 1919–1936	Succeeded by John A. Duffy
