= John A. Duffy =

American prelate

His Excellency, The Most Reverend John Aloysius Duffy
- Bishop of Buffalo
- Church: Roman Catholic Church
- Diocese: Buffalo
- Predecessor: William Turner
- Successor: John Francis O'Hara
- Previous posts: Bishop of Syracuse (1933 to 1937)

Orders
- Ordination: June 13, 1908 by Pietro Respighi
- Consecration: June 29, 1933 by Thomas Walsh

Personal details
- Born: October 29, 1884 Jersey City, New Jersey, US
- Died: September 27, 1944 (aged 59) Buffalo, New York, US
- Motto: Sapientia desursum (Wisdom from above)

Styles of John Aloysius Duffy
- Reference style: The Most Reverend
- Spoken style: Your Excellency
- Religious style: Monsignor
- Posthumous style: none

John Aloysius Duffy (October 29, 1884 – September 27, 1944) was an American prelate of the Roman Catholic Church. He served as bishop of the Diocese of Syracuse in New York from 1933 to 1937, and as bishop of the Diocese of Buffalo in New York from 1937 until his death in 1944.

== Biography ==
=== Early life ===
John Duffy was born on October 29, 1884, in Jersey City, New Jersey, to Patrick Joseph and Anna Marie (née Smith) Duffy. As a young man, he worked as a boilermaker in Elizabeth, New Jersey and Bayonne, New Jersey.

=== Priesthood ===
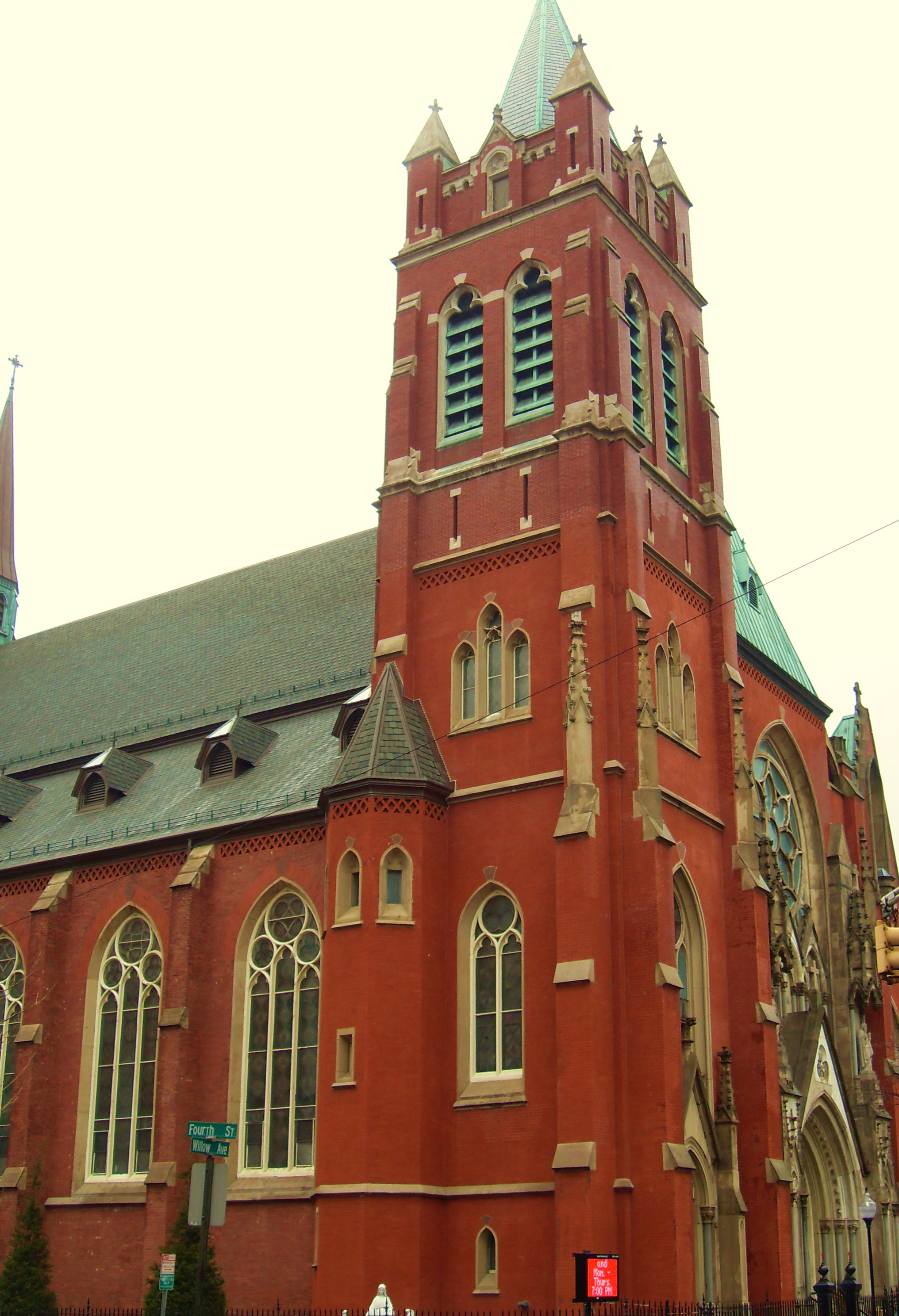
Our Lady of Grace Church, Hoboken, New Jersey (2010)

Duffy was ordained to the priesthood in Rome by Cardinal Pietro Respighi for the Diocese of Newark on June 13, 1908.

After his ordination, the archdiocese assigned as assistant pastor at the Our Lady of Grace Parish in Hoboken, New Jersey. He also taught literature and languages at Seton Hall University in South Orange, New Jersey, and was an instructor in church history at the archdiocesan seminary.The Vatican named Duffy as a domestic prelate, and he served as chancellor and vicar general for the diocese. As vicar general, Duffy was instrumental in the establishment of Queen of Angels, the first parish for people of color in the archdiocese. He was the diocese's apostolic administrator, running the archdiocese between the death of Archbishop John O'Connor and the appointment of Bishop Thomas Walsh. He also served as pastor of St. Joseph's Parish in Jersey City.

=== Bishop of Syracuse ===
On April 21, 1933, Duffy was appointed the fourth bishop of Syracuse by Pope Pius XI. He received his episcopal consecration in Newark at the Cathedral of the Sacred Heart on June 29, 1933, from Archbishop Walsh, with Bishops James Griffin and Alphonse Smith serving as co-consecrators. Duffy selected as his episcopal motto: "Wisdom from Above."In 1934, when fan dancer Sally Rand was scheduled to perform in Syracuse, Duffy stated,

"I must regard the presence of the Rand woman on the stage as an act of public defiance of the Catholic people of Syracuse."

=== Bishop of Buffalo ===
Pius XI named Duffy as the seventh bishop of Buffalo on January 9, 1937. He was installed on April 14, 1937. In 1939 and 1940. he served as secretary of the National Catholic Welfare Council.

During his tenure in Buffalo, Duffy established the diocesan Fund for the Faith for those left destitute because of the Great Depression of the 1930s. He erected parishes in the sparsely settled areas of the diocese, and organized the Catholic Youth Organization, the Bishop's Committee for Christian Home and Family, a chapter of the Confraternity of Christian Doctrine, and Newman Clubs in local colleges and universities.

=== Death ===
John Duffy died in Buffalo on September 27, 1944, at age 59. He was buried next to his parents in Holy Name Cemetery in Jersey City.

Catholic Church titles
Preceded by Daniel Joseph Curley	Bishop of Syracuse; 1933–1937	Succeeded by Walter Andrew Foery
Preceded by William Turner	Bishop of Buffalo; 1937–1944	Succeeded by John Francis O'Hara
