= Robert J. Cunningham =

American prelate

His Excellency, The Most Reverend Robert Joseph Cunningham
- Bishop Emeritus of Syracuse
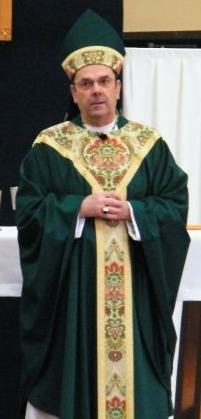
- Bishop Cunningham in October 2009
- Diocese: Syracuse
- Appointed: April 21, 2009
- Installed: May 26, 2009
- Retired: June 4, 2019
- Predecessor: James Michael Moynihan
- Successor: Douglas Lucia
- Previous post: Bishop of Ogdensburg (2004-2009)

Orders
- Ordination: May 24, 1969 by Bernard Joseph McLaughlin
- Consecration: May 18, 2004 by Edward Egan, Henry J. Mansell, and Gerald Barbarito

Personal details
- Born: June 18, 1943 (age 83) Buffalo, New York, US
- Denomination: Roman Catholic Church
- Motto: Ecclesia mater nostra (Our mother church)

Styles of Robert Joseph Cunningham
- Reference style: His Excellency; The Most Reverend
- Spoken style: Your Excellency
- Religious style: Bishop

Robert Joseph Cunningham (born June 18, 1943) is an American prelate of the Roman Catholic Church who served as bishop of the Diocese of Syracuse in Upstate New York from 2009 to 2019. He previously served as bishop of the Diocese of Ogdensburg in Northern New York from 2004 to 2009.

== Biography ==
=== Early life and education ===
Robert Cunningham was born on June 18, 1943, in Buffalo, New York, to Cecil and Grace Cunningham; he has a brother, Patrick, and a sister, Eileen. He attended St. John the Baptist Parish School and the Diocesan Preparatory Seminary, then entered St. John Vianney Seminary in East Aurora, New York. He received his Bachelor of Arts and Master of Divinity degrees from St. John Vianney.

=== Ordination and ministry ===
Cunningham was ordained to the priesthood for the Diocese of Buffalo by Bishop Bernard McLaughlin on May 24, 1969, in St. Joseph Cathedral in Buffalo. After his ordination, the diocese assigned Cunningham as associate pastor at Blessed Sacrament Parish in Kenmore, New York. In 1972, he was named assistant pastor at his home parish of St. John the Baptist, also in Kenmore.

Bishop Edward Head named Cunningham as his private secretary and assistant chancellor of the diocesein 1974. Cunningham was sent to Washington D.C. to study canon law at the Catholic University of America School of Canon Law, he earned his Licentiate in Canon Law in 1978. After returning to Buffalo, Cunningham was appointed as a judge of the marriage tribunal and vice-chancellor of the diocese. He was raised by the Vatican to the rank of monsignor in 1984, then Head appointed him as full chancellor in 1985 and vicar general In 1986.

In 1994, Head received a complaint from a man who claimed that his son had been sodomized by Reverend Donald W. Becker, a diocese priest. Becker had a previous history of sexual abuse complaints, yet was still assigned to a parish. As vicar general, Cunningham interviewed Becker, who said that he couldn't remember anything. However, Becker admitted that if he had been intoxicated, something could have happened. The parent did not request any further action and Cunningham dropped the case. In 2002, after Becker resigned due to poor health, Cunningham received another sexual abuse complaint against him, which Cunningham did not investigate.

In January 2002, Cunningham was named pastor of St. Louis Parish in Buffalo. He served as administrator of the diocesan College of Consultors from 2003 to 2004. Cunningham had board memberships for Christ the King Seminary, Catholic Charities, Baker Victory Services in Buffalo, and the Cantalician Center for Learning in Depew, New York.

=== Bishop of Ogdensburg ===
On March 9, 2004, Cunningham was appointed the as the thirteenth bishop of Ogdensburg by Pope John Paul II. He received his episcopal consecration on May 18, 2004, from Cardinal Edward Egan, with Archbishop Henry J. Mansell and Bishop Gerald Barbarito serving as co-consecrators, at St. Mary's Cathedral in Ogdensburg.He also served on the board of Wadhams Hall Seminary College in Ogdensburg.

=== Bishop of Syracuse ===
On April 21, 2009, Pope Benedict XVI named Cunningham as the tenth bishop of Syracuse. He was installed there on May 26, 2009.

In a 2011 deposition, Cunningham made statements about the victims of sex abuse by priests in the Diocese of Syracuse, implying that the victims were "culpable" and "accomplices". In 2015, when those statements became public, Cunningham said he wished he phrased his response differently.

"It is obvious that my choice of words should have been better. Bottom line is, I cannot go back and change my words but I can assure you that I did not believe the individual involved in the case was at fault."

He also repeatedly reiterated that he didn't believe children were responsible for being abused.On September 21, 2012, the Vatican appointed Cunningham as apostolic administrator of the Diocese of Rochester after the retirement of Bishop Matthew Clark.

=== Retirement ===
On June 18, 2018, Cunningham submitted his resignation as bishop of Syracuse to the Vatican upon reaching the age of 75. Pope Francis accepted his resignation on June 4, 2019. Cunningham served as apostolic administrator of the diocese until Reverend Douglas Lucia was consecrated a bishop on August 8, 2019.

== Honors ==
- Niagara University In Lewiston, New York, awarded Cunningham an honorary doctorate in humane letters in 1991.
- A charter member of the Kenmore Mercy Hospital Foundation Board, he was given the Sister Mary Mechtilde Memorial Award by the board in 2004.
- In 2007, Cunningham was awarded an honorary doctorate in humane letters from St. John's University in Staten Island, New York.

== See also ==
- Catholic Church hierarchy
- Catholic Church in the United States
- Historical list of the Catholic bishops of the United States
- List of Catholic bishops of the United States
- Lists of patriarchs, archbishops, and bishops

Catholic Church titles
| Preceded by James Michael Moynihan | Bishop of Syracuse; 2009–2019 | Succeeded by Douglas Lucia |
| Preceded by Gerald Michael Barbarito | Bishop of Ogdensburg; 2004–2009 | Succeeded by Terry R. LaValley |
