= Patrick Anthony Ludden =

Irish-born prelate

His Excellency, The Right Reverend Patrick Anthony Ludden
- Bishop of Syracuse
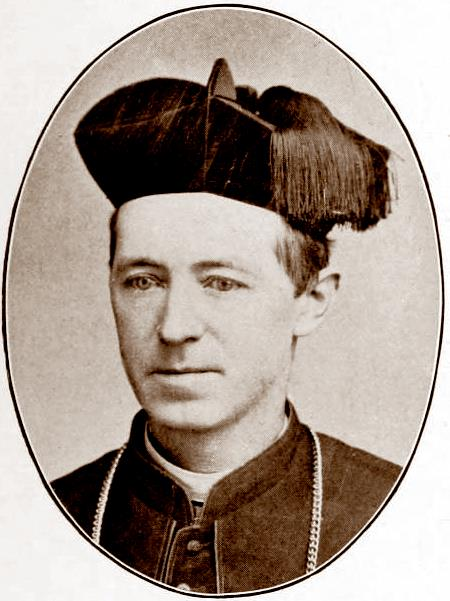
- See: Diocese of Syracuse
- In office: 1887-1912
- Successor: John Grimes

Orders
- Ordination: May 21, 1864 by Ignace Bourget
- Consecration: May 1, 1887 by Michael Corrigan

Personal details
- Born: February 4, 1836 Breaffy, County Mayo, Ireland
- Died: August 12, 1912 (aged 76) Syracuse, New York, US
- Denomination: Roman Catholic
- Parents: Anthony and Ellen (née Fitzgerald) Ludden
- Education: St. Jarlath's College; Grand Seminary of Montreal
- Motto: Justitia et pax (Justice and peace)

Patrick Anthony Ludden (February 4, 1836 – August 6, 1912) was an Irish-born prelate of the Roman Catholic Church. He served as the first bishop of the new Diocese of Syracuse in New York from 1887 until his death in 1912.

== Biography ==
=== Early life ===
Patrick Ludden was born on February 4, 1836, in Breaffy, near Castlebar, County Mayo, in Ireland to Anthony and Ellen (née Fitzgerald) Ludden. He graduated from St. Jarlath's College in Tuam, Ireland in 1861. Ludden then went to Canada to enter the Grand Seminary of Montreal in Montreal, Quebec.

=== Priesthood ===
After completing his theological studies, Ludden was ordained to the priesthood in Montreal for the Diocese of Albany by Bishop Ignace Bourget on May 21, 1864. After his ordination, Ludden went to the United States, where Bourget assigned him as rector of St. Joseph's Parish in Malone, New York. He later served as secretary to Bishop John McCloskey. Ludden was later named chancellor of the diocese, and accompanied Bishop John J. Conroy as his theologian in 1869 to the First Vatican Council in Rome. In 1872, Ludden became rector of the Cathedral of the Immaculate Conception in Albany, New York, and vicar general of the diocese. He was named rector of St. Peter's Church in Troy, New York, in 1880.

=== Bishop of Syracuse ===
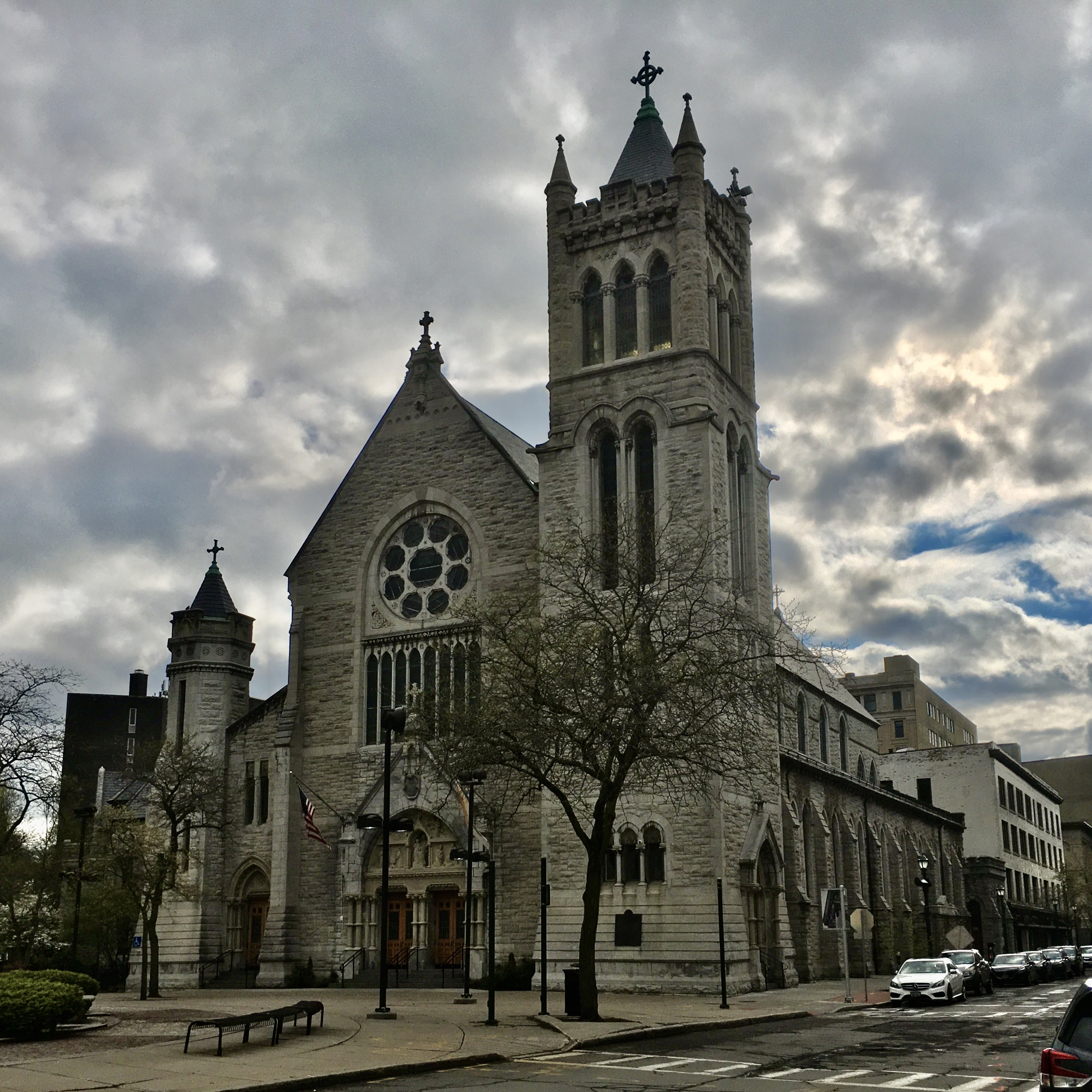
Cathedral of the Immaculate Conception, Syracuse, New York (2021)

On December 14, 1886, Ludden was appointed the first bishop of the newly erected Diocese of Syracuse by Pope Leo XIII. He received his episcopal consecration at the Church of the Assumption in Syracuse on May 1, 1887, from Archbishop Michael Corrigan, with Bishops Bernard McQuaid and Francis McNeirny serving as co-consecrators. During his 25-year-long tenure, he presided over a period of great growth in the young diocese.

At the time of Ludden's arrival, the diocese contained 70,000 Catholics, 74 priests, 46 parishes, 20 mission churches, and 16 parochial schools. By the time of his death, there were over 150,000 Catholics, 129 priests, 80 parishes, 36 mission churches, and 21 parochial schools. He selected St. Mary's Church in Syracuse as his new cathedral in 1903, and dedicated it in September 1910 as the Cathedral of the Immaculate Conception. In 1911, Ludden gained a degree of notoriety when he declared that the deadlock in the New York Legislature over the election of New York Lieutenant Governor William F. Sheehan to the United States Senate was due to anti-Catholicism. Sheehan was later defeated.

Bishop Ludden donated an altar to the Church of Our Lady of the Rosary, Castlebar, County Mayo.

=== Death and legacy ===
Patrick Ludden died at his residence in Syracuse, New York, on August 12, 1912, at age 74. He is buried in the crypt of the Cathedral of the Immaculate Conception. Bishop Ludden Junior/Senior High School in Syracuse was named after him.

Catholic Church titles
Preceded by none	Bishop of Syracuse; 1887–1912	Succeeded by John Grimes
