= Diocese of Syracuse =

Latin Catholic jurisdiction in New York, US

Coordinates: 43°02′45.7″N 76°08′58.7″W

Diocese of Syracuse Diœcesis Syracusensis
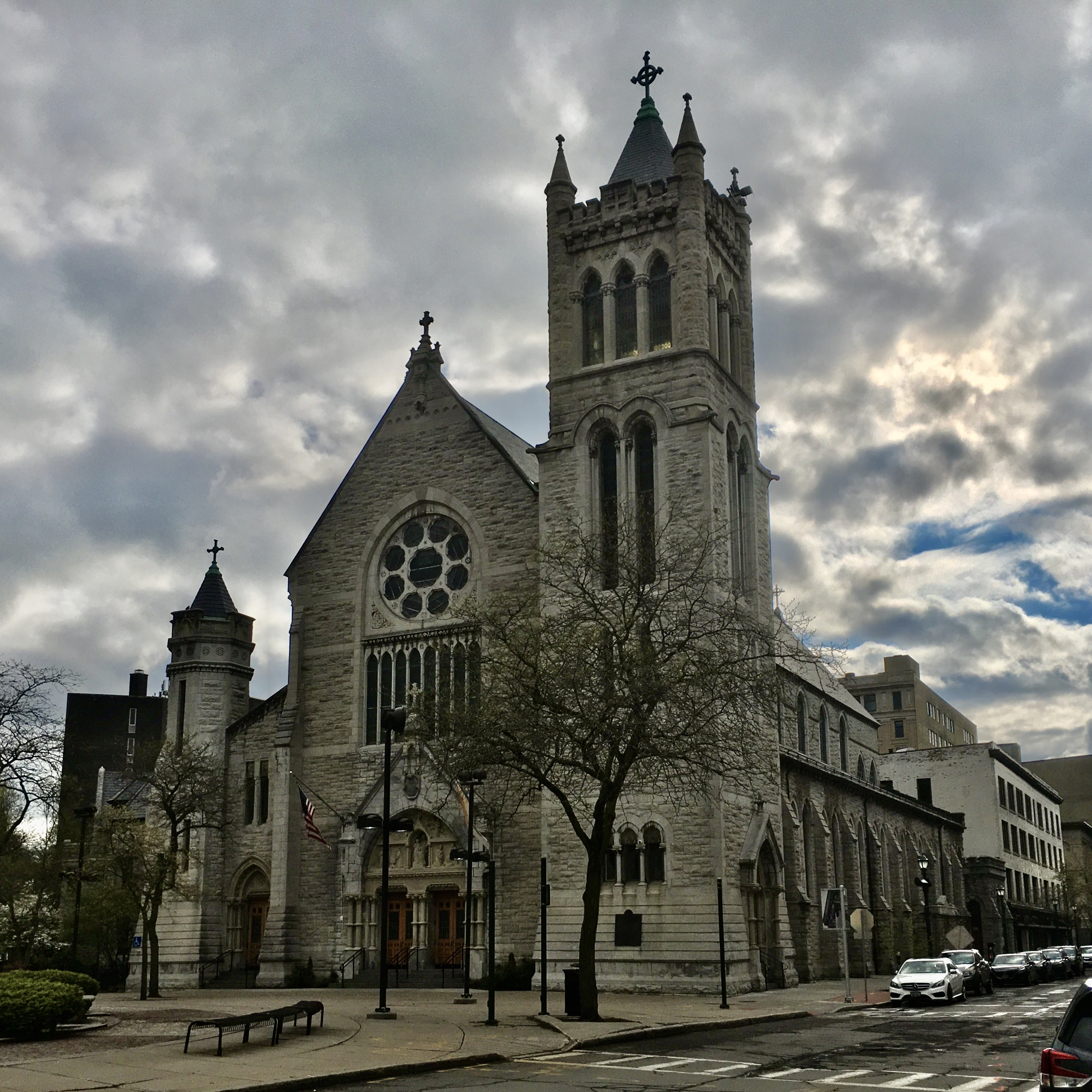
- Cathedral of the Immaculate Conception

- Coat of arms

Location
- Country: United States
- Territory: 5,479 square miles (14,190 km^{2}) in Central New York (Counties of Onondaga, Oneida, Broome, Chenango, Cortland, Madison, and Oswego, New York)
- Metropolitan: Archdiocese of New York

Statistics
- Population: Total; Catholics: (as of 2020); 1,186,894; 342,361 (28.8%)
- Parishes: 116
- Schools: 21

Information
- Denomination: Catholic
- Sui iuris church: Latin Church
- Rite: Roman Rite
- Established: November 26, 1886; 139 years ago
- Cathedral: Cathedral of the Immaculate Conception
- Patron saint: Our Lady of the Immaculate Conception
- Secular priests: 180

Current leadership
- Pope: Leo XIV
- Bishop: Douglas Lucia
- Metropolitan Archbishop: Ronald Hicks
- Vicar General: John J. Kurgan
- Bishops emeritus: Robert J. Cunningham

Map
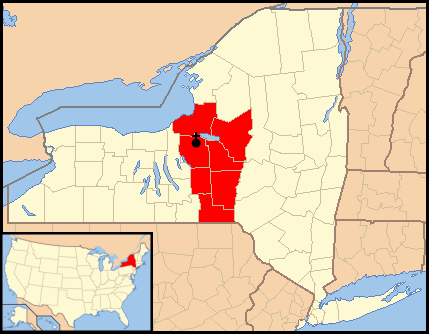

Website
- syracusediocese.org

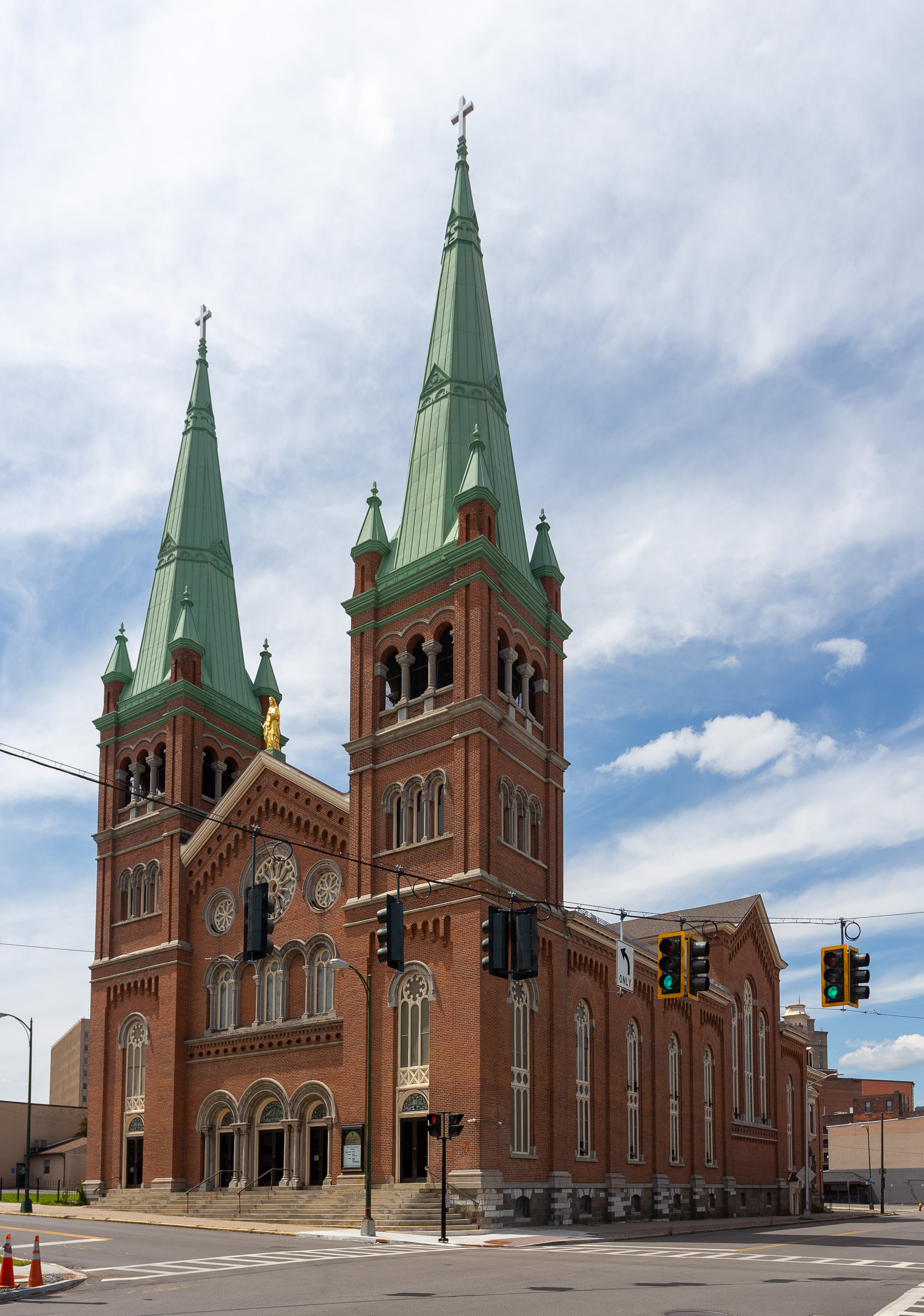
Historic Old St. John's in Utica

The Diocese of Syracuse (Latin: Diœcesis Syracusensis) is a diocese of the Catholic Church in Upstate New York in the United States. Its episcopal see is located in Syracuse. It is a suffragan diocese of the Archdiocese of New York. Douglas Lucia is the bishop.

== Territory ==
The Diocese of Syracuse includes seven counties: Broome, Chenango, Cortland, Madison, Oneida, Onondaga, Oswego.

== History ==
=== 1600 to 1700 ===
The first Catholic missionary, Simon Le Moyne, traveled to central New York in 1654 during a brief truce between the French and the Iroquois (Haudenosaunee) Confederacy. He was well suited for the expedition given his fluency in both the Huron (Wyandot) and Haudenosaunee languages. He left Quebec City in the French colony of New France to travel to the upper Mohawk Valley. During his 1654 visit, Onondaga Native Americans showed Le Moyne a spring that they believed to be cursed; he immediately recognized as a harmless salt spring.

In another visit to the area in 1656, the priests Pierre-Joseph-Marie Chaumonot and Claude Dablon laid the groundwork to build Sainte Marie among the Iroquois near present-day Syracuse. It was a sizable mission, housing about seven Jesuit priests and fifty French workmen.

In 1658, the French were forced to abandon Sainte Marie due to fears of an attacks by Mohawk/Haudenosaunee tribesmen. Additional missions in the area were undertaken later by both Jesuit and Sulpicians missionaries.

After the Dutch ceded their colony of New Amsterdam (New York) to the British in 1667, political tensions started rising in central New York. The British and French began disputing the territory, leading them to incite their allies, the French-allied Wyandot and the British-allied Haudenosaunee, to fight each other. This situation led to rivalries, atrocities, and reprisals between the two Native American nations. This situation made it difficult for missionaries to safely maintain and continue their missions.

=== 1700 to 1800 ===
Just before the year 1700, the colonial legislature under Governor Bellomont passed laws banning Catholics in the British Province of New York, which included all of Upstate New York. One law mandated a life sentence to any Catholic priest. The penalty for harboring a Catholic was a £250 fine plus three days in the pillory. As a result, Catholic missionaries left the province. The last Jesuit missionary to the Iroquois surrendered at Albany in 1709. Great Britain gained full legal control over this territory with the signing of the Treaty of Paris (1763).

After the approval of the New York Constitution in 1777, freedom of worship for Catholics was guaranteed. This was soon followed by the same guarantee in the US Constitution.

On November 26, 1784, Pope Pius VI erected the Apostolic Prefecture of United States of America, including all of the new United States. On November 6, 1789, the same pope raised this prefecture to the Diocese of Baltimore. An early Catholic in the central New Region was Dominick Lynch, the founder of Rome. Lynch signed an address of congratulations by American Catholics to George Washington upon his election as American president in 1789.

=== 1800 to 1886 ===
On April 8, 1808, Pope Pius VII erected the Diocese of New York, taking all of New York State from the Diocese of Baltimore. The population of Catholics swelled when teams of Irish Catholics arrived to construct the Erie Canal, and also when the opening of the canal increased trade, commerce, and additional immigration. Paul McQuade, pastor of St. Mary's Church in Albany from 1813 to 1815, frequently visited Utica, and probably celebrated Masses there in private homes. The first public mass in Utica was celebrated in the courthouse on January 10, 1819. The first new Catholic church in the region, St. John's, was constructed in Utica in 1821. With the advent of railroads in the region, even more Catholic immigrants started moving there.

In 1847, recognizing the population growth in Upstate New York, Pope Pius IX erected the Diocese of Albany, including all of the current territory of the Diocese of Syracuse.

=== 1886 to 1923 ===
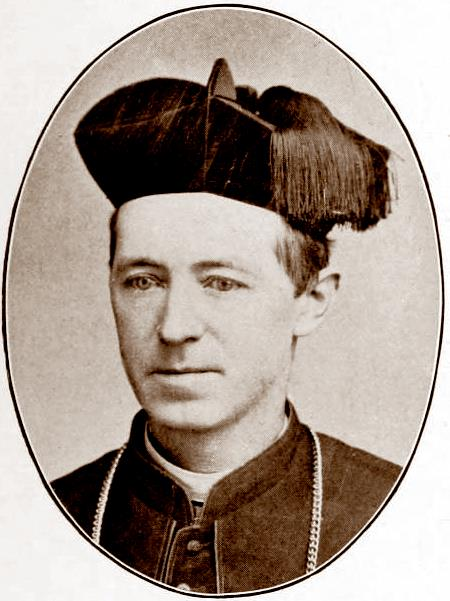
Bishop Ludden (pre-1912)

In 1886, Pope Leo XIII erected the Diocese of Syracuse, taking its territory from the Diocese of Albany. The pope named Monsignor Patrick Ludden of Albany as the first bishop of Syracuse. St. John the Evangelist Church was selected to serve as the first cathedral. At the time of Ludden's arrival, the diocese contained 70,000 Catholics, 74 priests, 46 parishes, 20 mission churches, and 16 parochial schools. He selected St. Mary's Church in Syracuse as his new cathedral in 1903, and dedicated it in September 1910. In 1909, John Grimes of Albany was appointed coadjutor bishop of the diocese.

By the time of Ludden's death in 1912, the diocese had a Catholic population over 150,000, with 129 priests, 80 parishes, 36 mission churches, and 21 parochial schools. When Ludden died, Grimes served as bishop until his death in 1922.

=== 1923 to 1970 ===
Daniel Curley was the next bishop, beginning in 1923. During Curley's tenure, the Catholic population of the diocese increased from 173,200 to 201,152. He established a Society for the Propagation of the Faith, 28 parishes, 18 schools, the Loretto Rest facility, and Lourdes Hospital. At his invitation, the Sisters of Perpetual Rosary opened the first home for cloistered nuns in Syracuse. Curley died in 1932.

In 1933, John A. Duffy became the fourth bishop of Syracuse. In 1934, when fan dancer Sally Rand was scheduled to appear in Syracuse, Duffy commented, "I must regard the presence of the Rand woman on the stage as an act of public defiance of the Catholic people of Syracuse." Four years later in 1937, Pius XI named Duffy as bishop of the Diocese of Buffalo.

Walter Foery replaced Duffy in 1937. In 1959, he expressed "shock and deep regret" that the Syracuse Metropolitan Health Council had admitted Planned Parenthood. After 33 years as bishop, Foery retired in 1970.

=== 1970 to present ===
Auxiliary David Cunningham of Syracuse replaced Foery in 1970, named by Pope Paul VI. Cunningham retired six years later and Paul VI named Auxiliary Bishop Francis Harrison of Syracuse to replace him. Harrison practiced a collegial manner of governing, and worked to include laity and especially women in the diocesan affairs. He launched diocesan programs for African Americans, Hispanic, Native Americans, and the disabled. He once played a game of golf with comedian Bob Hope, who later recorded a radio ad for the diocese's first HOPE Appeal, an annual fundraiser Harrison started in 1978. Harrison resigned in 1987.

Pope John Paul II named Auxiliary Bishop Joseph O'Keefe of the Archdiocese of New York as the next bishop of Syracuse. O'Keefe served in Syracuse until his retirement in 1995. The same pope then selected Monsignor James Moynihan of the Diocese of Rochester to succeed O'Keefe as bishop. In 1998, Moynihan removed the priest Richard McBrien from his job as a columnist for the diocesan newspaper, replacing him with writer George Weigel; this action dismayed some members of the diocesan clergy. Moynihan was a founding member of the Bishop Sheen Ecumenical Housing Foundation, named after Bishop Fulton J. Sheen.

After Moynihan retired in 2009, Pope Benedict XVI selected Bishop Robert J. Cunningham of the Diocese of Ogdensburg as the next bishop of Syracuse. In a 2011 legal deposition, Cunningham made statements about the sex abuse victims, describing them as "culpable" and "accomplices". In 2015, when the statements became public, Cunningham said "my choice of words should have been better, [...] but I can assure you that I did not believe the individual involved in the case was at fault." He repeatedly reiterated that he does not believe children are responsible for being abused. He retired in 2018.

The current bishop of the Diocese of Syracuse is Douglas Lucia, formerly a priest of the Diocese of Ogdensburg. He was named by Pope Francis in 2019. In June 2020, Lucia announced that the diocese had filed for Chapter 11 bankruptcy due to the cost of lawsuits from sexual abuse cases. Just days before the bankruptcy filing, 38 plaintiffs filed new lawsuits under the New York Child Victims Act. In December 2024, Nathan Brooks, who once served at parishes in Cortland County, pled guilty to endangering the welfare of a child. He was sentenced to probation, counseling, and a full stay-away order from the victim; Brooks also faced a charge of forcible touching, but the family said it was satisfied with the resolution on the endangering charge. Cortland County District Attorney Patrick noted that in addition to violating the law, Brooks violated the policies of the diocese.

== Bishops ==
=== Bishops of Syracuse ===
1. Patrick Anthony Ludden (1886–1912)
2. John Grimes (1912–1922)
3. Daniel Joseph Curley (1923–1932)
4. John A. Duffy (1933–1937), appointed Bishop of Buffalo
5. Walter Andrew Foery (1937–1970)
6. David Frederick Cunningham (1970–1977)
7. Francis James Harrison (1977–1987)
8. Joseph Thomas O'Keefe (1987–1995)
9. James Michael Moynihan (1995–2009)
10. Robert J. Cunningham (2009–2019)
11. Douglas Lucia (2019–present)

=== Former auxiliary bishops ===
Thomas Joseph Costello (1978–2004)

== List of schools ==
- Blessed Sacrament School, Syracuse
- Holy Cross School, DeWitt
- Holy Family School, Fairmount
- Holy Family School, Norwich
- Immaculate Conception School, Fayetteville
- Most Holy Rosary School, Syracuse
- Notre Dame Elementary School, Utica
- St. James School, Johnson City
- St. John the Evangelist School, Binghamton
- St. Mary's Academy, Baldwinsville
- St. Mary's School, Cortland
- St. Patrick's School, Oneida
- St. Rose of Lima School, North Syracuse
- Trinity Catholic School, Oswego
- Bishop Ludden-Grimes Junior/Senior High School – Syracuse
- Notre Dame Junior Senior High School – Utica
- Seton Catholic Central High School – Binghamton

== Coat of arms ==
Coat of arms of Diocese of Syracuse
Notes Arms was designed and adopted when the diocese was erected Adopted 1886 Escutcheon The diocesan arms consists of a blue field with a gold (yellow) Latin cross. Entwined around the cross is a silver (white) dolphin. To the upper left is a silver (white) crescent. Symbolism The blue field with the gold cross represents faith. The dolphin comes from a coin minted in the ancient Greek city of Syracuse in Sicily. The crescent honors Mary in her title of the Immaculate Conception.
