= Cathedral of the Immaculate Conception (Syracuse, New York) =

The Cathedral of the Immaculate Conception
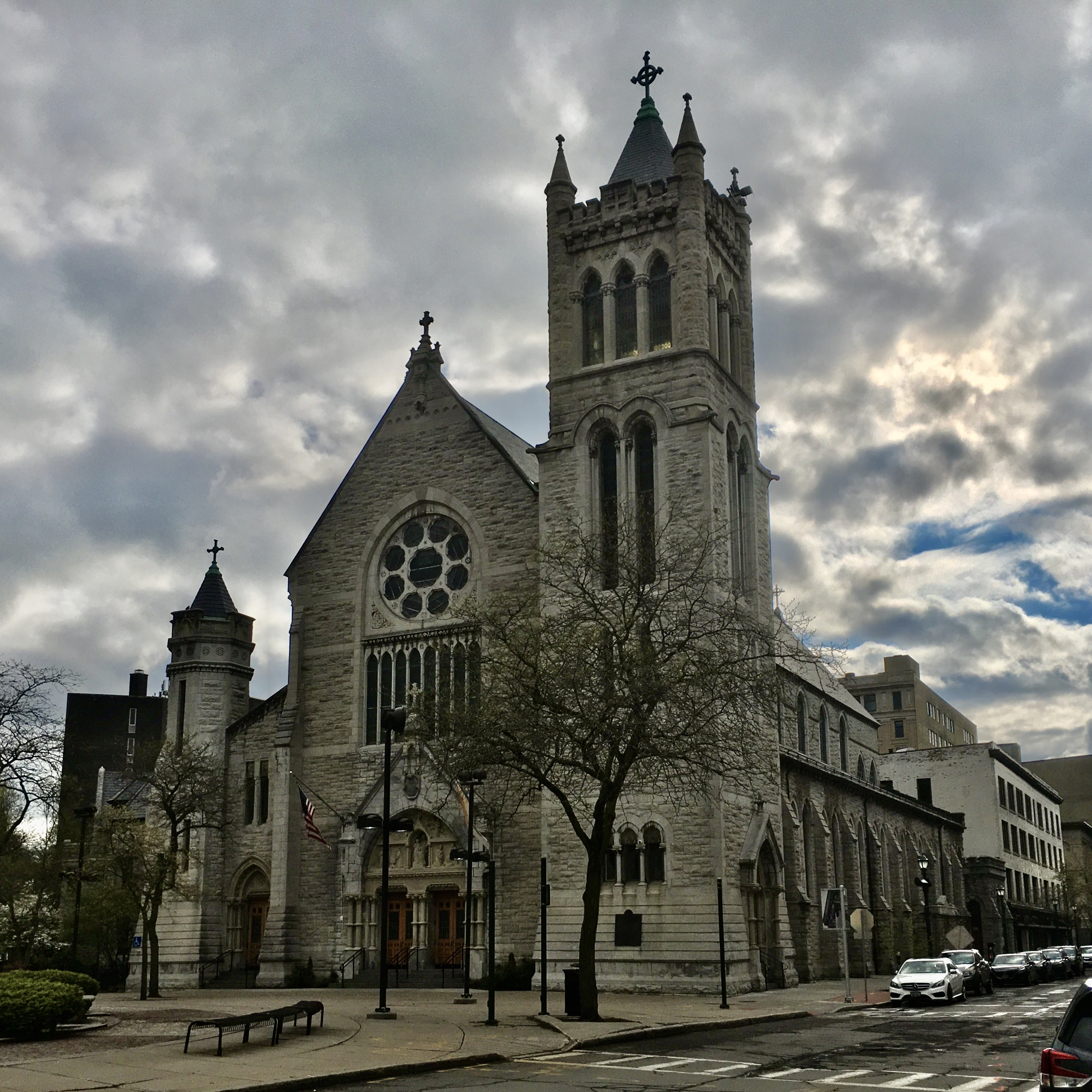

- Location within New York
- 43°02′48.55″N 76°08′59.4″W
- Location: 259 E. Onondaga St. Syracuse, New York 13202
- Country: United States
- Denomination: Roman Catholic
- Website: www.cathedralsyracuse.org

History
- Status: Cathedral
- Founded: 1830
- Dedication: Immaculate Conception
- Consecrated: 1874 (as Parish Church); 1904 (as Cathedral)

Architecture
- Architect(s): Original Church Lawrence J. O'Connor; 1904 Expansion Archimedes Russell
- Style: Gothic Revival
- Completed: 1874

Specifications
- Materials: Limestone

Administration
- Diocese: Diocese of Syracuse

Clergy
- Bishop: Most Rev. Douglas Lucia
- Rector: Rev. Neal Quartier

The Cathedral of the Immaculate Conception in Syracuse, New York, in the United States is the mother church of the Roman Catholic Diocese of Syracuse. It is the seat of the bishop of Syracuse; as of 2026, the bishop is Douglas Lucia.

== History ==
The precursor of Immaculate Conception Cathedral was St. Mary's Church, built in Syracuse in 1874 by Lawrence J. O'Connor. In 1887, the Vatican erected the Diocese of Syracuse and appointed Patrick Anthony Ludden as its first bishop. Using his own funds, Ludden purchased property next to St. Mary's Church to expand the church into a cathedral. He commissioned the architect Archimedes Russell to design a new sanctuary and bell tower.

The Cathedral of the Immaculate Conception was consecrated in 1910. For the dedication, Pope Leo XIII gave Ludden a brick taken from the holy door at St. Peter's Basilica in Rome. When Ludden died in 1912, he was interred in the cathedral crypt.

In 2013, the diocese installed a mosaic in the cathedral depicting Mother Marianne Cope surrounded by her leprosy patients in Hawaii. Custom-made in Italy, the mosaic is 10 by 5 feet (3.0 by 1.5 m). Cope was the first director of St. Joseph's Hospital in Syracuse before moving to Hawaii in 1883.

Immaculate Conception underwent a major renovation project in 2017. It was rededicated on September 8, 2017, by Cardinal Timothy Dolan and Bishop Robert J. Cunningham.

The Shrine of the Blessed Mother is located in the cathedral. It features a statue sculpted by Jacqueline Belfort-Chalat.

== Ministries ==
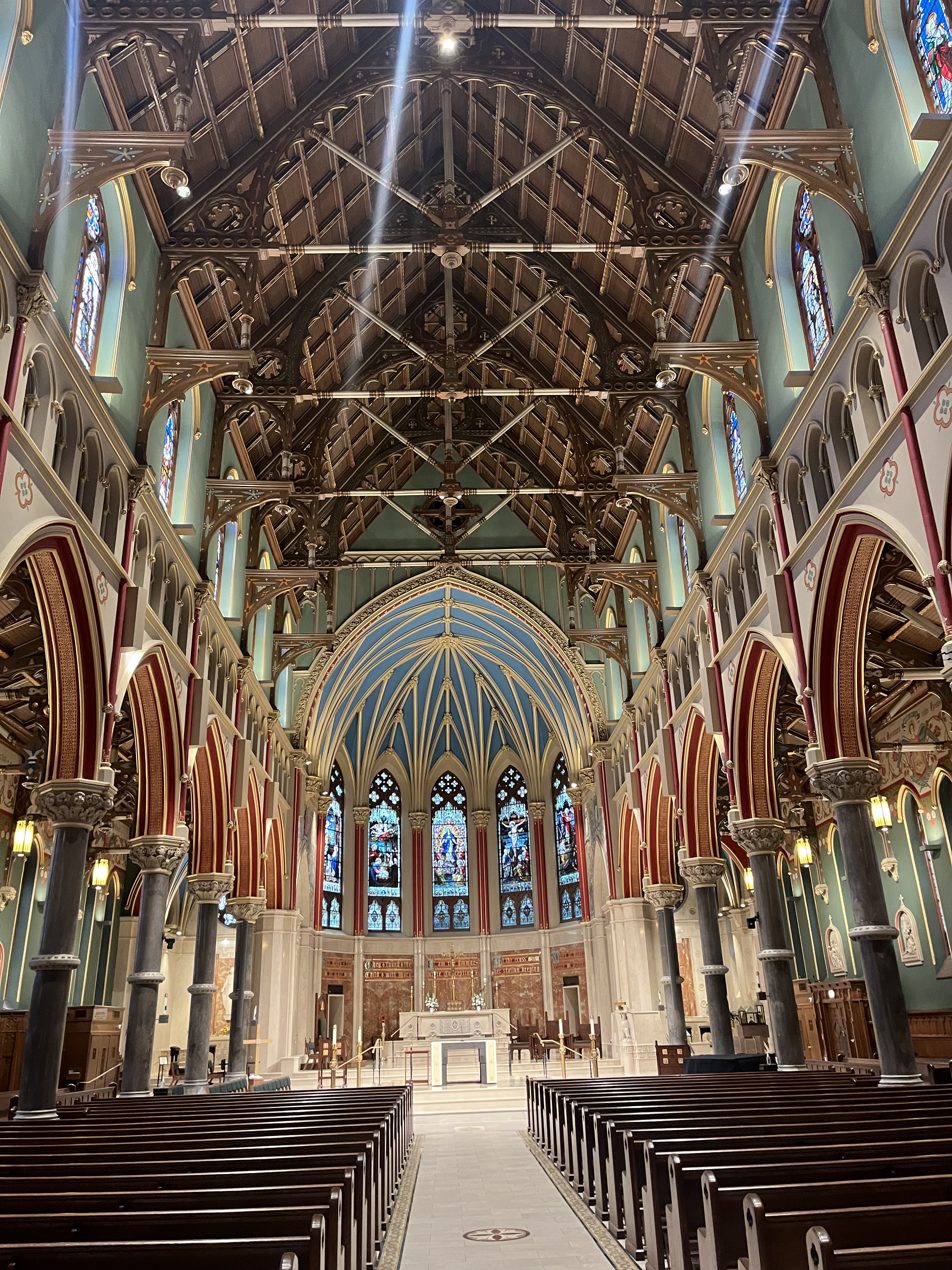
Interior, Immaculate Conception Cathedral (2025)

The Cathedral Emergency Services operates a food pantry in downtown Syracuse. Amaus Health Services at the cathedral offers dental and vision services to the poor and uninsured.

== Music ==
The cathedral hosts local musicals and concerts performed by both area high schools, colleges, and professional groups. A selection of works by Herbert Howells played on the cathedral's 1892 Roosevelt-Schantz organ has been released on CD.

== See also ==
- List of Catholic cathedrals in the United States
- List of cathedrals in the United States
- Roman Catholic Marian churches
