= Gregory J. Studerus =

Roman Catholic priest

His Excellency, The Most Reverend Gregory J. Studerus
- Auxiliary Bishop Emeritus of Newark; Titular Bishop of Tarasa in Byzacena
- Archdiocese: Newark
- Appointed: February 27, 2020
- Installed: June 30, 2020
- Retired: May 30, 2025
- Predecessor: Thomas Donato
- Successor: Pedro Bismarck Chau
- Other post: Titular Bishop of Tarasa in Byzacena

Orders
- Ordination: May 31, 1980 by Peter Leo Gerety
- Consecration: June 30, 2020 by Joseph W. Tobin, Manuel Aurelio Cruz, and John Walter Flesey

Personal details
- Born: March 31, 1948 (age 78) West Orange, New Jersey, US
- Motto: Forget not His love

Styles of Gregory James Studerus
- Reference style: His Excellency; The Most Reverend
- Spoken style: Your Excellency
- Religious style: Bishop

Gregory James Studerus (born March 31, 1948) is an American Catholic prelate who served as an auxiliary bishop for the Archdiocese of Newark between 2020 and 2025.

== Biography ==
=== Early life ===
Gregory Studerus was born in Orange, New Jersey, on March 31, 1948. Growing up in West Orange, New Jersey, he attended Our Lady of the Valley High School in Orange. Studerus then entered Montclair State College in Montclair, New Jersey, receiving a bachelor's degree in art education in 1970.

After his college graduation, Studerus worked for a number of years as an artist and teacher, owning an art gallery and workshop at one point. After deciding to become a priest, he entered the Seminary of the Immaculate Conception in Huntington, New York, where he obtained a Master of Divinity degree in 1980.

=== Priesthood ===
On May 31, 1980, Studerus was ordained to the priesthood at the Cathedral Basilica of the Sacred Heart in Newark, New Jersey, by Archbishop Peter Leo Gerety for the Archdiocese of Newark.

After his ordination, Studerus was appointed parochial vicar to St. Aloysius Parish in Jersey City, New Jersey. During this period, he attended Spanish language programs in Mexico and the Dominican Republic. In 1990, Studerus was appointed pastor of St. Bridget Parish in Jersey City. He also served on the presbyteral council and as dean of the Jersey City Downtown Deanery. In 1997, Studerus was the founding pastor of Resurrection Parish, a combination of five smaller parishes.

In 2005, Studerus was appointed pastor of St. Joseph of the Palisades Parish in West New York, New Jersey. In 2005, Pope Benedict XVI named him as a chaplain of his holiness, with the title of monsignor. In 2013, Studerus started a three-year stint as dean of North Hudson Deanery 8. He was appointed episcopal vicar in 2015 for Hudson County, New Jersey.

=== Auxiliary Bishop of Newark ===
Pope Francis appointed Studerus as auxiliary bishop of Newark on February 27, 2020. His consecration, originally scheduled for May 5, 2020, was postponed due to the COVID-19 pandemic. It occurred on June 30, 2020, with Cardinal Joseph Tobin as the principal consecrator, with Auxiliary Bishops Manuel Cruz and John Flesey serving as co-consecrators. On May 30, 2025, Pope Leo XIV accepted his resignation as auxiliary bishop at the age of 77.

== See also ==
- Catholic Church hierarchy
- Catholic Church in the United States
- Historical list of the Catholic bishops of the United States
- List of Catholic bishops of the United States
- Lists of patriarchs, archbishops, and bishops

== Episcopal succession ==
Catholic Church titles
Preceded by -	Auxiliary Bishop of Newark; 2020-2025	Succeeded by Pedro Bismarck Chau
