= Pedro Bismarck Chau =

American Roman Catholic clergyman

His Excellency, The Most Reverend Pedro Bismarck Chau
- Auxiliary Bishop of Newark
- Archdiocese: Newark
- Appointed: May 30, 2025
- Installed: September 8, 2025
- Other post: Titular Bishop of Catrum

Orders
- Ordination: May 24, 2008 by John Joseph Myers
- Consecration: September 8, 2025 by Joseph William Tobin, John Walter Flesey and Gregory J. Studerus

Personal details
- Born: June 28, 1967 (age 59) Managua, Nicaragua
- Motto: Dios es mi fuerza (God is my strength)
- Coat of arms

Styles of Pedro Bismarck Chau
- Reference style: His Excellency; The Most Reverend
- Spoken style: Your Excellency
- Religious style: Bishop

Pedro Bismarck Chau (born June 28, 1967) is a Nicaraguan bishop of the Catholic Church who has been an auxiliary bishop of the Archdiocese of Newark since September 2025. He is the first Nicaraguan-born bishop in the US.

== Biography ==
Pedro was born on June 28, 1967, in Managua, Nicaragua. He is the youngest of seven children born to Camilo Arturo Chau and Luisa Amanda Lainez. To avoid required military service and dangerous combat against anti-government rebels, he travelled alone at the age of 16 and entered the US illegally from Mexico in January 1984. He soon settled in Brooklyn and worked to support his mother and a few siblings while studying English at LaGuardia Community College and getting his high school equivalency diploma. Though he felt called to the priesthood, he pursued a secular career for years, living in Linden, New Jersey, and working on Catholic retreat programs and providing music for them. He served on the national youth committee of the Catholic Charismatic Renewal. When he accepted his priestly vocation, he attended Seton Hall University, earning a bachelor's degree in psychology in 2004. He completed his theology studies at Immaculate Conception Seminary School of Theology. On May 24, 2008, Chau was ordained a priest for the Archdiocese of Newark.

His assignments in the Archdiocese included: parish vicar of Our Lady of Mount Virgin in Garfield from 2008 to 2012; associate director of CYO, and youth and young adult ministry from 2012 to 2015); assistant vocations director from 2012 to 2016; head of university pastoral care at Rutgers University (Newark) and the New Jersey Institute of Technology from 2015 to 2020; parish priest of Saint John and of Saint Patrick's Pro-Cathedral from 2015 to 2020; member of the priest personnel board from 2017 to 2020; and rector of the Cathedral Basilica of the Sacred Heart from 2020 to 2025. He was awarded a master's degree in professional counseling from Seton Hall University in 2021.

Pope Leo XIV appointed Chau auxiliary bishop for the Archdiocese of Newark on May 30, 2025. Chau received his episcopal consecration on September 8, 2025, from Cardinal Joseph W. Tobin, Archbishop of Newark. As his episcopal motto he chose a phrase from Isaiah 49:5, Dios Es Mi Fuerza ("God is My Strength"). He became the first Nicaraguan-born bishop in the US. His initial responsibilities include the parishes of Hudson County and a variety of Catholic institutions.

Chau is a naturalized US citizen; Nicaragua has revoked his citizenship. He has been an outspoken critic of the government of Nicaraguan President Daniel Ortega and in 2023 described the Church's situation there as "a spiritual battle against evil".

Chau has a sister who is deaf and is especially devoted to providing pastoral services to the deaf community. He is fluent in American Sign Language. He has said Mass in sign language since 2008 and was doing so monthly when named a bishop in 2025.

Catholic Church titles
Preceded by Gregory J. Studerus	Auxiliary Bishop of Newark; 2025-Present	Succeeded by -
