= Elias R. Lorenzo =

American Catholic prelate (born 1960)

His Excellency, The Most Reverend Elias R. Lorenzo OSB
- Auxiliary Bishop of Newark
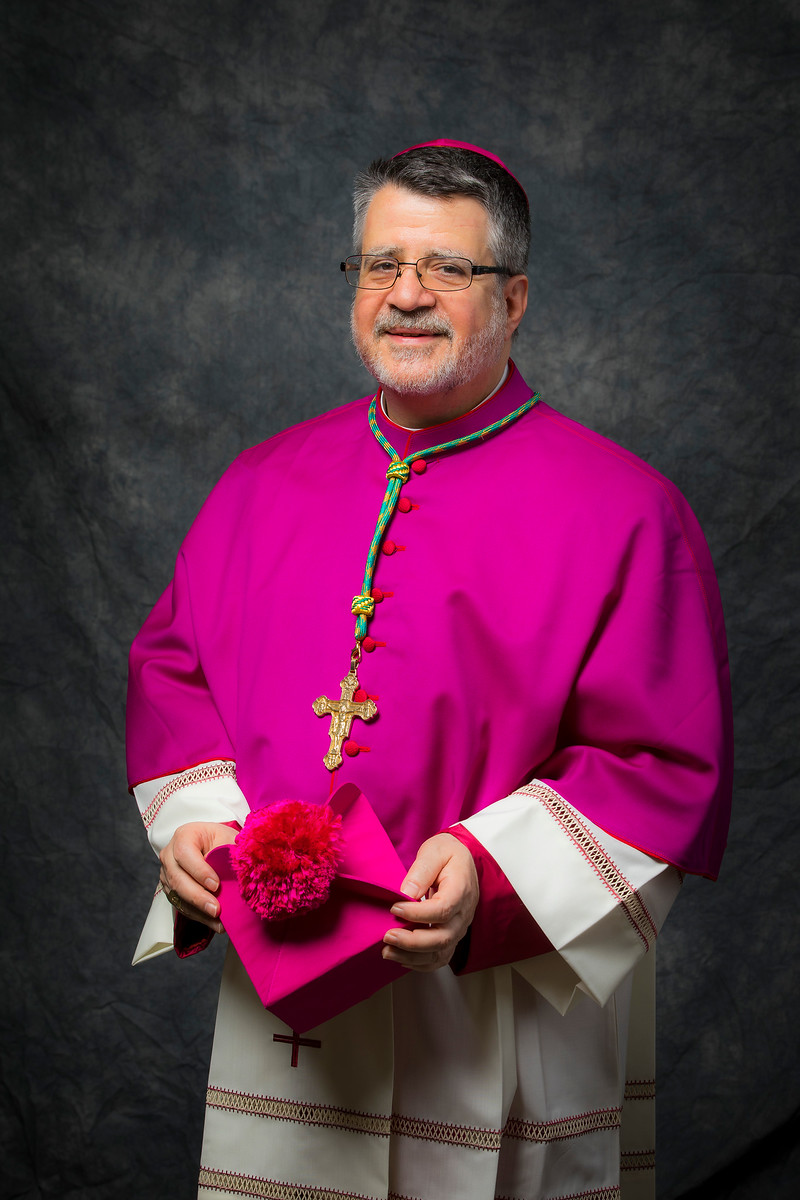
- Lorenzo in 2020
- Archdiocese: Newark
- Appointed: February 27, 2020
- Installed: June 30, 2020
- Other post: Titular Bishop of Tabuda
- Previous post: Abbot-President, American-Cassinese Benedictine Congregation (2016–2020)

Orders
- Ordination: June 24, 1989 by Frank Joseph Rodimer
- Consecration: June 30, 2020 by Joseph W. Tobin, Manuel Aurelio Cruz, John Walter Flesey

Personal details
- Born: October 6, 1960 (age 65) Brooklyn, New York, US
- Education: Don Bosco College; St. John's University; Seton Hall University; Catholic University of America
- Motto: Nihil impossibile apud Deum (Latin for 'Nothing is impossible with God')
- Styles
- Reference style: His Excellency; The Most Reverend
- Spoken style: Your Excellency
- Religious style: Bishop

Elias Richard Lorenzo (born October 6, 1960) is an American Catholic prelate serving as an auxiliary bishop for the Archdiocese of Newark in New Jersey since 2020. He previously served as Abbot-president of the American-Cassinese Congregation of Benedictines. He was the third member of St. Mary's Abbey in Morris Township, New Jersey, to hold this position and the first to become a bishop.

== Biography ==
=== Early life ===
Lorenzo was born on October 6, 1960, in Brooklyn, New York to William Elias and Mae Theresa Lorenzo. He attended St. Agatha Parish Elementary School in Sunset Park, Brooklyn and Cathedral Preparatory School and Seminary in Fort Greene, Brooklyn.

Lorenzo enrolled in Don Bosco College in Newton, New Jersey, where he received a Bachelor of Arts degree in philosophy. In 1983, he entered St. Mary's Abbey in Morris Township, New Jersey. That same year, he started teaching at the Delbarton School in Morristown, New Jersey. He made his first profession to the Order of Saint Benedict (OSB) in 1985.

=== Priesthood ===
Lorenzo was ordained a priest of the Order of Saint Benedict at St. Mary's Abbey by Bishop Frank Joseph Rodimer on June 24, 1989. After his ordination, he was named director of liturgy at the Abbey, a position he would hold for the next ten years. He continued to teach at Delbarton, fulfilling several roles until being named vice president of the school.

Within the Diocese of Paterson, Lorenzo joined the Paterson Diocesan Liturgical Commission in 1988 and was named chair in 1991. At St. Mary's Abbey, Lorenzo was named prior in 1995 as director of liturgy, prior of the abbey and rector of the Abbey Church.

Following his service as prior, Lorenzo was appointed vicar for religious in the Diocese of Metuchen. Thereafter, he worked as canonical counsel for Praesidium, Inc. in the development of national safe environment standards and protocols. He served on Praesidium's client advisory board from 2016 to 2020, a body of major superiors of men's and women's religious orders who provided client feedback to Praesidium on their safe environment stanards for religious youth-serving groups.

In 2009, Lorenzo went to Rome to serve as prior of the Primatial Abbey of Saint Anselmo. In addition, he worked as procurator general for OSB in Rome. After his return to New Jersey in 2011, he was named president of the International Benedictine Confederation, holding that post until 2016.

In 2016, Lorenzo was elected abbot president of the American Cassinese Congregation, an association of Benedictine monasteries in the United States. As abbot president, Lorenzo was a member of the federal Union of Superiors General and the Conference of Major Superiors of Men.

Lorenzo holds the following advanced degrees:

- Master of Liturgical Theology from St. John's University in Collegeville, Minnesota
- Master of Education in counseling psychology from Seton Hall University in South Orange, New Jersey
- Licentiate in Canon Law from the Catholic University of America in Washington D.C.

Lorenzo was a founding member of the International Commission for Benedictine Education and served as its president. In this role, he visited Benedictine schools throughout the United States, Western Europe, South America, Latin America, Africa, Australia, and the Philippines. Lorenzo served on the advisory board of Operation Smile International, having participated in medical missions to Bolivia, China, Honduras, India, Kenya, Nicaragua, and the Philippines.

=== Auxiliary Bishop of Newark ===
On February 27, 2020, Lorenzo was appointed as an auxiliary bishop of Newark by Pope Francis. Lorenzo's consecration, scheduled for May 5, 2020, but postponed due to the COVID-19 pandemic, occurred on June 30, 2020 at the Cathedral Basilica of the Sacred Heart in Newark. The principal consecrator was Cardinal Joseph W. Tobin. The co-consecrators were Auxiliary Bishops John Flesey and Manuel Cruz. As of June 2020, Lorenzo serves as regional bishop for Union County in the archdiocese.

== See also ==
- Catholic Church hierarchy
- Catholic Church in the United States
- Historical list of the Catholic bishops of the United States
- List of Catholic bishops of the United States
- Lists of patriarchs, archbishops, and bishops
