= Manuel Aurelio Cruz =

Cuban-born American prelate

His Excellency, The Most Reverend Manuel Aurelio Cruz
- Auxiliary Bishop of Newark; Titular Bishop of Gaguari
- Archdiocese: Newark
- Appointed: June 9, 2008
- Installed: September 8, 2008
- Other post: Titular Bishop of Gaguari
- Previous posts: Vice President of Mission and Ministry for Catholic Health and Human Services; Director of the Archdiocesan Office of Pastoral Care; Chaplain of His Holiness; Parochial Vicar of Cathedral Basilica of the Sacred Heart; Member of the Archdiocesan Vocations Committee; Parochial Vicar of Holy Rosary Church, Elizabeth, NJ

Orders
- Ordination: May 31, 1980 by Peter Leo Gerety
- Consecration: September 8, 2008 by John Joseph Myers, Peter Leo Gerety, and David Arias Pérez
- Rank: Titular Bishop of Gaguari

Personal details
- Born: December 2, 1953 (age 72) Havana, Cuba
- Denomination: Roman Catholic
- Education: Immaculate Conception Seminary School of Theology
- Motto: Caritas (Charity)

Styles of Manuel Aurelio Cruz
- Reference style: His Excellency; The Most Reverend
- Spoken style: Your Excellency
- Religious style: Bishop

Manuel Aurelio Cruz (born December 2, 1953) is a Cuban-born American Catholic prelate who has served as an auxiliary bishop of the Archdiocese of Newark in New Jersey since 2008. He survived an assault at the Cathedral Basilica of the Sacred Heart in 2017.

== Biography ==
=== Early life ===
Manuel Cruz was born in Havana, Cuba, on December 2, 1953, to Juan and Caridad Cruz. The Cruz family immigrated to the United States from Cuba in 1966 after the Cuban Revolution. The Cruz family lived in Florida before settling in Union City, New Jersey. In his youth, Manuel Cruz spent eight years working in the emergency department at Saint James Hospital in Newark, New Jersey.

Cruz entered Seton Hall University in South Orange, New Jersey, finishing with a Bachelor of Arts in philosophy. He then studied at the Immaculate Conception Seminary School of Theology at Seton Hall University, earning a Master of Arts in sacred scripture.

=== Priesthood ===
Cruz was ordained a priest at the Cathedral of the Sacred Heart Parish in Newark by Archbishop Peter Gerety for the Archdiocese of Newark on May 31, 1980. He was the first Cuban-born priest ordained in the archdiocese.

Following his ordination, the archdiocese assigned Cruz as parochial vicar at Holy Rosary Parish in Elizabeth, New Jersey. In 1982, he was transferred as parochial vicar at the Cathedral of the Sacred Heart Parish. Archbishop Theodore McCarrick named Cruz to the archdiocesan vocations committee in 1986. Cruz served as dean of the Deanery 19 from 1991 to 1993. In 1995, he became a chaplain at Saint Michael's Medical Center in Newark and later was named director of the archdiocesan Office of Pastoral Care.

In 2000, Pope John Paul II elevated Cruz to the rank of chaplain of his holiness. In 2005, Archbishop John J. Myers named Cruz vice president for mission and ministry for Catholic Health and Human Services. Cruz has served on the institutional review boards of several New Jersey hospitals, the ethics committee of Saint Michael's Medical Center in Newark and the Committee on Ethics of the New Jersey Catholic Conference.

=== Auxiliary Bishop of Newark ===
On June 9, 2008, Cruz was appointed as an auxiliary bishop of Newark and titular bishop of Gaguari by Pope Benedict XVI. He received his episcopal consecration on September 8, 2008, from Myers, with Gerety and Bishop David Pérez serving as co-consecrators. Cruz choose a single word for his episcopal motto: Caritas.

On January 29, 2017, during an afternoon service at the Cathedral Basilica of the Sacred Heart in Newark, Cruz was assaulted by a stranger. Charles Miller, a Newark resident, approached Cruz while he was praying in the sanctuary and punched him in the face, knocking him on the ground. Police at the cathedral immediate arrested Miller and charged him with simple assault. At the time of his arrest, Miller claimed to be a Protestant pastor. Cruz was treated at a hospital, receiving 30 stitches on his mouth. The mass was being offered in the memory of the baseball player Roberto Clemente.

== Coat of arms ==
Cruz's coat of arms is composed of a shield and a scroll with his motto and external ornamentation. Cruz's arms, which occupy the entire shield, are composed of a silver field with a red Latin cross superimposed by a blue M for Mary. The shield is completed by the external ornamentation of a Catholic bishop, a gold processional cross behind it and a green galero. The galero has a green cord and six tassels on each side of the shield.

== See also ==
- Catholic Church hierarchy
- Catholic Church in the United States
- Historical list of the Catholic bishops of the United States
- List of Catholic bishops of the United States
- Lists of patriarchs, archbishops, and bishops

== Episcopal succession ==
Catholic Church titles
| Preceded by – | Auxiliary Bishop of Newark; 2008-present | Incumbent |
