= Gaetano Aldo Donato =

Catholic bishop (1940–2015)

Styles of Gaetano Aldo Donato
- Reference style: The Most Reverend
- Spoken style: Your Excellency
- Religious style: Monsignor
- Posthumous style: not applicable

Gaetano Aldo "Thomas" Donato (1 October 1940 – 25 August 2015) was an Italian-American prelate of the Roman Catholic Church. He notably served as an auxiliary bishop of the Archdiocese of Newark, New Jersey.

== Early life and education ==
Gaetano Aldo Donato was born in Jersey City, New Jersey, to Antonio and Rosa Donato, who had immigrated to the United States from Italy in 1923. The fifth of six children, he had two sisters, Mary and Rose, and three brothers, Constantino, John and Robert. Named after his paternal grandfather, Donato has, however, always gone by Thomas. After attending Holy Rosary Elementary School and St. Michael High School in Jersey City, he began his studies for the priesthood at the seminary at Seton Hall University. Donato had wanted to become a priest since the second grade, when he was asked to give an oral composition answering the question, "What do you want to be when you grow up?" He graduated from the College Seminary in 1961, and attended Immaculate Conception Seminary in Darlington from 1961 to 1966, earning a Master of Divinity degree.

== Priesthood ==
On 29 May 1965, Donato was ordained a priest for the Archdiocese of Newark by Archbishop Thomas A. Boland. He then served as parochial vicar at St. John the Baptist Parish in Hillsdale until 1973, and at St. Vincent de Paul Parish in Bayonne from 1973 to 1982. He then became pastor of Our Lady of the Assumption Parish in Bayonne, where Donato introduced extraordinary ministers of the Eucharist and lectors into the Mass. From 1988 to 2001, he was pastor of St. Paul Parish in Ramsey. He was raised to the rank of Monsignor in 1996.

After attending a six-month sabbatical to attend the Institute for Continuing Education of Clergy at the Pontifical North American College in Rome, he became administrator and later pastor of St. Raphael Parish in Livingston. Donato also served as the regional director of religious education for Bergen County North. He was a three-term member of the Archdiocesan Priest Personnel Board; a member of the Archdiocesan Offices of Catechetics and Divine Worship; and the Episcopal Vicar of Bergen County West. In 2003, he was named spiritual director of Immaculate Conception Seminary.

== Episcopal ministry ==
On 21 May 2004, Donato was appointed Auxiliary Bishop of Newark and Titular Bishop of Jamestown by Pope John Paul II. He received his episcopal consecration on the following 4 August from Archbishop John J. Myers, with Bishops Michael A. Saltarelli and Arthur J. Serratelli serving as co-consecrators, at the Cathedral Basilica of the Sacred Heart. As an auxiliary bishop, he served as Episcopal Vicar of Hudson County and pastor of St. Henry Parish in Bayonne. He died on August 25, 2015, aged 74, in Community Medical Center, Toms River NJ, after a brief battle with cancer.

Catholic Church titles
Preceded by –	Auxiliary Bishop of Newark; 2004-present	Incumbent
