= Winand Wigger =

German-American prelate

Right Rev. Winand Michael Wigger
- Bishop of Newark
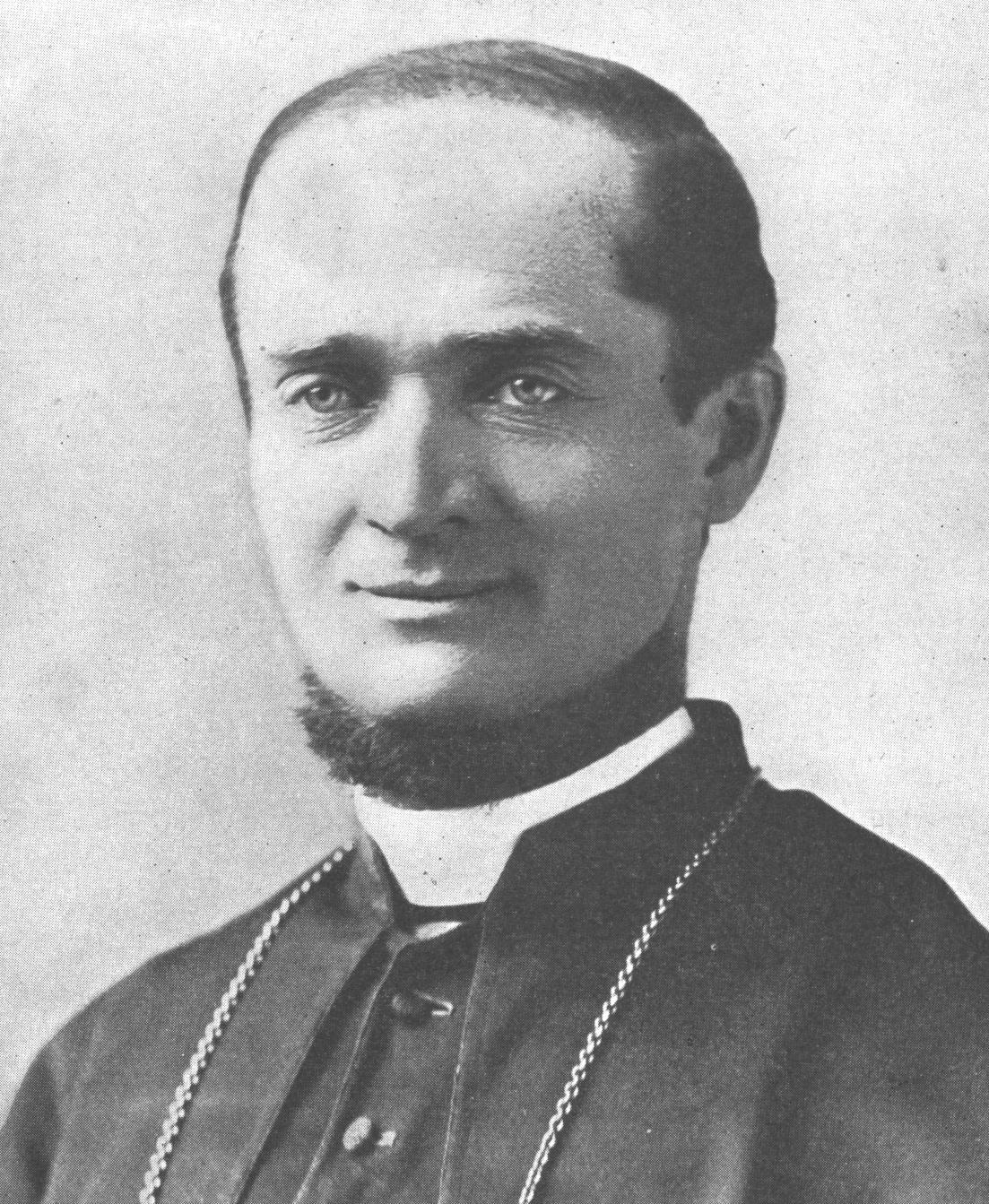
- Church: Roman Catholic Church
- See: Newark
- Installed: October 18, 1881
- Predecessor: Michael Corrigan
- Successor: John Joseph O'Connor

Orders
- Ordination: June 10, 1865
- Consecration: October 18, 1881

Personal details
- Born: December 9, 1841 New York, New York
- Died: January 5, 1901 (aged 59) South Orange, New Jersey

Winand Michael Wigger (December 9, 1841 – January 5, 1901) was a German American prelate of the Roman Catholic Church. He served as the third Bishop of Newark from 1881 until his death.

== Early life and education ==
Winand Wigger was born in New York City to John Joseph and Elizabeth (née Strucke) Wigger, who immigrated to the United States from Westphalia in the late 1830s. The second of four children, he had three brothers: Joseph John, Robert, and Theodore. He was a sickly child and the family returned to Germany in December 1843 in the hope that a sea voyage might better his health. In August 1845, the family moved back to New York, where his father became successful and prosperous.

Wigger attended the parochial school of St. Francis of Assisi Church and in September 1853 entered St. Francis Xavier's College, where he studied the classics and distinguished himself as an accomplished student and skilled musician. He graduated with a Bachelor of Arts degree in July 1860. Deciding to follow a vocation to the priesthood, he then applied to St. Joseph's Seminary in Fordham but was rejected due to poor health. Wigger was instead accepted at Seton Hall Seminary in the Diocese of Newark, New Jersey. In 1862, he went to further his studies at the seminary of Brignole-Sale in Genoa, Italy, where he was ordained a priest by Archbishop Andreas Charvaz on June 10, 1865. Before returning home, he spent several months in Rome and Westphalia.

== Priesthood ==
During Wigger's voyage back to the United States in 1866, his steamship suffered an outbreak of cholera among the passengers in steerage; after docking at the Bay of New York, the young priest remained on board for two weeks to administer to the sick and dying. After arriving in Newark, he was assigned as an assistant priest at St. Patrick's Cathedral. U.S. Senator James Smith (D-New Jersey) later described his years at St. Patrick's by saying,

Other young priests found time for social diversion, but Dr. Wigger knew only one pleasure—to do his duty. He not only gave wise counsel to those who sought it, but from his own means he gave alms to the needy; he was ever ready to aid the suffering and to offer the consolations of religion to the sick and the dying. Young as he was, he was regarded by the poor and the simple as a true father."

In 1869 he returned to Rome and there earned a doctorate in sacred theology from the University of the Sapienza.

Following his return to the Newark Diocese, in April 1869, Wigger was appointed pastor of St. Vincent Martyr in Madison, New Jersey. His financial abilities caught the attention of Bishop Michael Corrigan, who transferred him in May 1873 to St. John's Church in Orange, which was then over a quarter million dollars in debt. Wigger lessened the debt to some degree (raising about $2,000 every month), but his hard work caused his health to suffer. He was the founding pastor of St. Teresa of Avila in Summit from 1874 until 1876, when he returned to St. Vincent's in Madison. He constructed a new rectory for St. Vincent's in 1877.

== Episcopal ministry ==
Following Bishop Corrigan's promotion to Coadjutor Archbishop of New York in October 1880, Wigger was appointed the third Bishop of Newark by Pope Leo XIII on July 11, 1881. He received his episcopal consecration on the following October 18 from Archbishop Corrigan, with Bishops John Loughlin and Bernard John McQuaid serving as co-consecrators, at St. Patrick's Cathedral. In August of that year, the Diocese of Trenton was carved out of the Diocese of Newark, consisting of the southern part of the state. Shortly afterwards, Wigger declared, "In the Church of God there is no distinction of race, color or tongue." At the time of his consecration as a bishop, there were 121 priests, 83 churches, 18,396 students enrolled in diocesan schools, and 145,000 Catholics in the diocese; by the time of his death nearly twenty years later, there were 256 priests, 153 churches, 34,817 students, and 300,000 Catholics.

After making a survey of all the church property in the Newark Diocese, the Bishop negotiated a loan of $2 million at a low interest rate to cover the mortgages on many churches. He also made Seton Hall Seminary one of the chief objects of his solicitude, and even established his residence there. In 1883, he removed the Catholic Protectory to Mount Arlington and established the Sacred Heart Union to aid in its maintenance. Wigger was fiercely hostile to alcohol abuse, and even ordered in 1884 that the last rites of the Church be denied to those who sold alcohol to minors or drunkards. The brewers were German and the saloon keepers Irish, but some viewed Wigger's hostility to drink as an anti-Irish bias.

He also met conflict with the German-speaking immigrant population who were attracted to non-Catholic societies and religions; the Bishop was committed to preserve the faith of the German immigrants. A central figure in the Cahensly controversy, he also insisted on German parishes, with their own schools, and the preservation of German culture. Wigger appointed his first vicar general in 1885, attended the Third Council of Baltimore, and held the fifth diocesan synod in November 1886, at which strict regulations were enacted in regard to funerals and attendance at parochial and public schools. He even threatened excommunication against Catholic parents who sent their children to non-Catholic schools, and unsuccessfully attempted to introduce state legislation to secure the state's support for Catholic schools.

One of Wigger's greatest achievements was the construction of the Cathedral of the Sacred Heart. The City of Newark wanted to buy the site for the new Newark High School in 1896, but the Bishop rejected the idea. He broke ground in January 1898, and laid the cornerstone in June 1899.

=== Later life and death ===
After celebrating Christmas Mass at St. Patrick's Cathedral in 1900, Wigger was stricken with pneumonia and went abroad in search of rest and health. On his return he resumed his duties but later died in his bedroom at Seton Hall, aged 59. His funeral Mass was celebrated by Archbishop Corrigan, and his remains were buried in the priests' plot in the Holy Sepulchre Cemetery in East Orange.

Catholic Church titles
Preceded by Michael Corrigan	Bishop of Newark; 1881–1901	Succeeded by John Joseph O'Connor
