= John J. O'Connor (bishop of Newark) =

Bishop of Newark (1855–1927)

John Joseph O'Connor
- Bishop of Newark
- In office: 1901–1927

Orders
- Ordination: December 22, 1877 by Carlo Andrea Anthonis
- Consecration: July 25, 1902 by Michael Corrigan

Personal details
- Born: June 11, 1855 Newark, New Jersey, U.S.
- Died: May 20, 1927 (aged 71) South Orange, New Jersey, U.S.
- Buried: Cathedral of the Sacred Heart
- Denomination: Roman Catholic
- Parents: Thomas and Catherine (née Farrell) O'Connor
- Education: Seton Hall University
- Alma mater: Pontifical North American College

John Joseph O'Connor (June 11, 1855 – May 20, 1927) was an American prelate of the Catholic Church. He served as Bishop of Newark from 1901 until his death in 1927.

== Early life and education ==
O'Connor was born in Newark, New Jersey to Thomas and Catherine (née Farrell) O'Connor, Irish immigrants. His father worked as a contractor and builder. He received his early education at the parochial school of St. James the Less Church in Newark, and then attended a private school run by Bernard Kearney in the same city. He studied at Seton Hall University in South Orange, where he earned a Bachelor of Arts degree in 1873. He was then sent by Bishop Winand Wigger to study theology at the Pontifical North American College in Rome, where he remained for four years. He then studied for one year at the American College of Louvain in Belgium.

== Priesthood ==
On December 22, 1877, O'Connor was ordained to the priesthood by Bishop Carlo Andrea Anthonis at St. Rumbold's Cathedral in Mechelen. Following his return to New Jersey, he was appointed professor of philosophy and dogmatic theology at Seton Hall. He later became director of Immaculate Conception Seminary at Seton Hall. In addition, he served as chaplain of St. Mary's Orphanage and assisted at parishes in Irvington and Short Hills on weekends. He was named vicar general of the Diocese of Newark in 1892 and then rector of St. Joseph's Church in Newark in 1895.

== Episcopacy ==
On May 24, 1901, O'Connor was appointed the fourth Bishop of Newark by Pope Leo XIII. He received his episcopal consecration on the following July 25 from Archbishop Michael Corrigan, with Bishops Charles McDonnell and James McFaul serving as co-consecrators, at St. Patrick's Cathedral in Newark.

During his tenure, O'Connor presided over a period of explosive growth for the diocese. The Catholic population more than doubled, standing at over 683,000 by the time of his death. He increased the number of churches from 114 to 273, the number of priests from 265 to 712, and the number of Catholic school students from 35,330 to 82,462. He also established over 45 missions and chapels. He continued to oversee the construction of the Cathedral of the Sacred Heart, which had been initiated by Bishop James Roosevelt Bayley.

In 1903, O'Connor condemned the oath of the International Typographical Union and forbade Catholics from taking it, saying, "A man owes his allegiance first to God. That is equivalent to the allegiance he owes his Church. If this oath or pledge requires the members of a union to do anything which the Catholic Church forbids—it being a religious organization as described in the oath—no Catholic can conscientiously take the oath or make such a pledge." He was made Assistant at the Pontifical Throne by Pope Pius X in 1910. In 1926, fear of accidents caused O'Connor to prohibit the priests of Newark from owning or driving motor vehicles, except in rural parishes.

O'Connor died of bronchial asthma in South Orange, New Jersey, at age 71. He is buried at the Cathedral of the Sacred Heart.

Catholic Church titles
Preceded by Winand Wigger	Bishop of Newark; 1901–1927	Succeeded by Thomas Walsh
