= Our Lady of the Valley High School =

Defunct Catholic high school in Essex County, New Jersey, US

Coordinates: 40.764888°N 74.248950°W

Our Lady of the Valley High School was a Catholic high school in Orange in Essex County, in the U.S. state of New Jersey, that operated under the supervision of the Roman Catholic Archdiocese of Newark.

The school closed in June 1981.

== Athletics ==
The boys basketball team won the Non-Public Group C state championship in 1970 (vs. St. Joseph's High School of Toms River) and won the Non-Public B title in 1979 (vs. St Joseph's of Toms River).

In 1973, the baseball team, seeded first, won the 41st Annual Greater Newark Tournament by defeating second-seed Bloomfield High School by a score of 3-1 in the tournament final. At the end of the season, Our Lady of the Valley was named the state's top high school baseball team (all groups, all high schools) by The Star-Ledger, finishing with a 23-4 record.

The baseball team won the Non-Public Group B state championship in 1977, defeating St. John Vianney High School in the tournament final.

== Notable alumni ==
- John B. Duff (1931–2013), historian who served as the 8th President of Columbia College Chicago.
- Richard Codey (1946–2026), politician who served in the New Jersey Senate and as Governor of New Jersey.
- Brian Hill (born 1947, class of 1965), retired American basketball coach.
- Mary Jo Kopechne (1940–1969, class of 1958), campaign worker for Robert F. Kennedy's 1968 presidential campaign who asphyxiated when a car driven by Ted Kennedy left a narrow road on Chappaquiddick Island
- James T. McHugh (1932–2000), prelate of the Roman Catholic Church who served as Bishop of Camden (1989–98) and Bishop of Rockville Centre (2000).
- Gregory J. Studerus (born 1948), prelate of the Roman Catholic Church who has been serving as an auxiliary bishop for the Archdiocese of Newark

Joseph Bilby, class of 1961, who subsequently received BA and MA degrees at Seton Hall University and served as a lieutenant in the 1st Infantry Division in Vietnam. He has authored over 29 books on New Jersey and military history and received awards from the New Jersey Historical Commission for his work.

== Notable faculty ==
- Richie Adubato (1937–2025), former basketball coach in the NBA for the Detroit Pistons, Dallas Mavericks and Orlando Magic, who coached the basketball team at Our Valley in 1964 and 1965.
