= Dominic Anthony Marconi =

20th and 21st-century American Catholic bishop

His Excellency, The Most Reverend Dominic Anthony Marconi
- Auxiliary Bishop Emeritus of Newark; Titular Bishop of Bure
- Archdiocese: Newark
- Appointed: May 3, 1976
- Installed: June 25, 1976
- Retired: July 1, 2002
- Other post: Titular Bishop of Bure

Orders
- Ordination: May 30, 1953 by Thomas Aloysius Boland
- Consecration: June 25, 1976 by Peter Leo Gerety, Thomas Aloysius Boland, and Harold Robert Perry

Personal details
- Born: March 13, 1927 (age 99) Newark, New Jersey, US
- Denomination: Roman Catholic

Styles of Dominic Anthony Marconi
- Reference style: His Excellency; The Most Reverend
- Spoken style: Your Excellency
- Religious style: Bishop

Dominic Anthony Marconi (born March 13, 1927) is an American prelate of the Roman Catholic Church. Marconi served as an auxiliary bishop of the Archdiocese of Newark in New Jersey from 1976 to 2002.

== Biography ==
Dominic Marconi was born on March 13, 1927, Newark, New Jersey. He was ordained to the priesthood by Archbishop Thomas Boland for the Archdiocese of Newark on May 30, 1953.

After his ordination, Marconi served until 1966 as associate pastor at St. Anthony's Parish in Union City, New Jersey. He was named associate director family life apostolate in 1966 and became director in 1970.

During the 1970s, Marconi served as chaplain for St. Joseph’s School for the Blind in Jersey City, New Jersey. Marconi led the Vicariate of Union City, with 43 parishes and was director of the archdiocese's Division of Services to the Elderly.

=== Auxiliary Bishop of Newark ===
On May 3, 1976, Pope Paul VI appointed Marconi as an auxiliary bishop of the Archdiocese of Newark and titular bishop of Bure. He was consecrated by Archbishop Peter Gerety at the Cathedral Basilica of the Sacred Heart in Newark on June 25, 1976.

=== Retirement ===
On July 1, 2002, Pope John Paul II accepted Marconi's letter of resignation as auxiliary bishop of Newark, submitted by Marconi when he reached the mandatory retirement of 75 for bishops.

Catholic Church titles
Preceded by –	Auxiliary Bishop of Newark; 1976-2002	Succeeded by –
