= Djebel-Trozza =

Coordinates: 35°33′N 9°35′E

Djebel-Trozza is a mountain in the Forest of Aala, due east of Al Qayrawan, Tunisia. Djebel Trozza is located at 35° 33' 51"N and 9° 35' 35" E.

There is an abandoned Lead/Zinc mine on the mountain.

On the mountain, Roman Empire ruins are identified as the remains of Tarasa in Byzacena, which is a Titular see of the Roman Catholic Church. Gregory J. Studerus, auxiliary bishop of Newark, New Jersey, is the current titular bishop.
