= Schantz Organ Co. =

Coordinates: 40°50′05″N 81°45′47″W

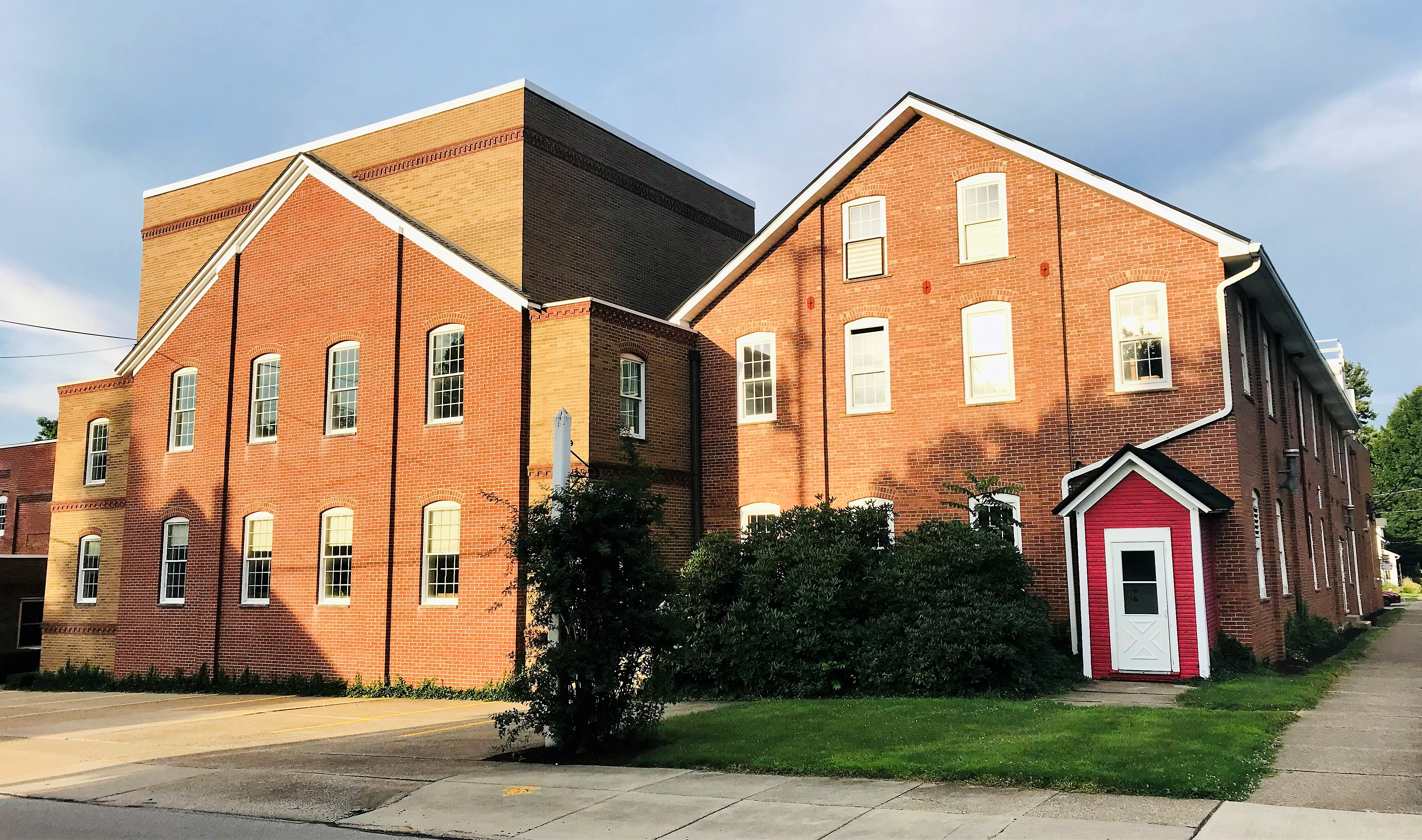
Schantz Organ Company

The Schantz Organ Company of Orrville, Ohio is a builder and restorer of pipe organs. Their facilities are located in Orrville, Ohio, about 44 miles due south of Cleveland, Ohio.

== History ==
The Schantz Organ Company was founded in 1873 by A.J. Tschantz (later changed to Schantz). Combining his inventive skills with a love of music, Schantz began building pipe organs after a brief venture into the construction of reed (parlor) organs.

In the early part of the twentieth century, A.J.'s sons joined him in his organ building shop. Under their leadership, the growing company developed a strong reputation as a regional builder. (Most of the early instruments were modest in size and found within a couple of hundred miles of the workshop in Orrville.) In turn, their sons learned the skills of the trade and took over the operation of the company. It was under the leadership of the third generation (following World War II) that the company developed its national reputation. In 1947, the company hired renowned organ builder Ernest Skinner, then nearly 80 years old, for two years before Skinner's permanent retirement.

Today work continues under the management of Company President Victor Schantz, representing the fourth generation of the Schantz family, and Vice-Presidents Jeffrey Dexter and Eric Gastier. Commissions for the firm include projects ranging in scope from restoration of existing instrument to the construction of an entirely new organ, and in size from small organs of a few ranks to complex designs for large halls, churches and cathedrals. The firm's magnum opus (of 154 ranks) stands in the Cathedral of the Sacred Heart in Newark, New Jersey. Schantz's best-known rebuilding and restoration projects include the Grand Organ of the Melbourne Town Hall (Australia), the Cleveland Orchestra's instrument in Severance Hall, the organ of Rockefeller Chapel at the University of Chicago, and the two organs of the Cathedral of Mary Our Queen in Baltimore.

The building complex was listed on the National Register of Historic Places in 2021 for its longevity in the design, manufacture, and distribution of pipe organs.
