= Kenmare High School =

Catholic high school in Jersey City, New Jersey, United States

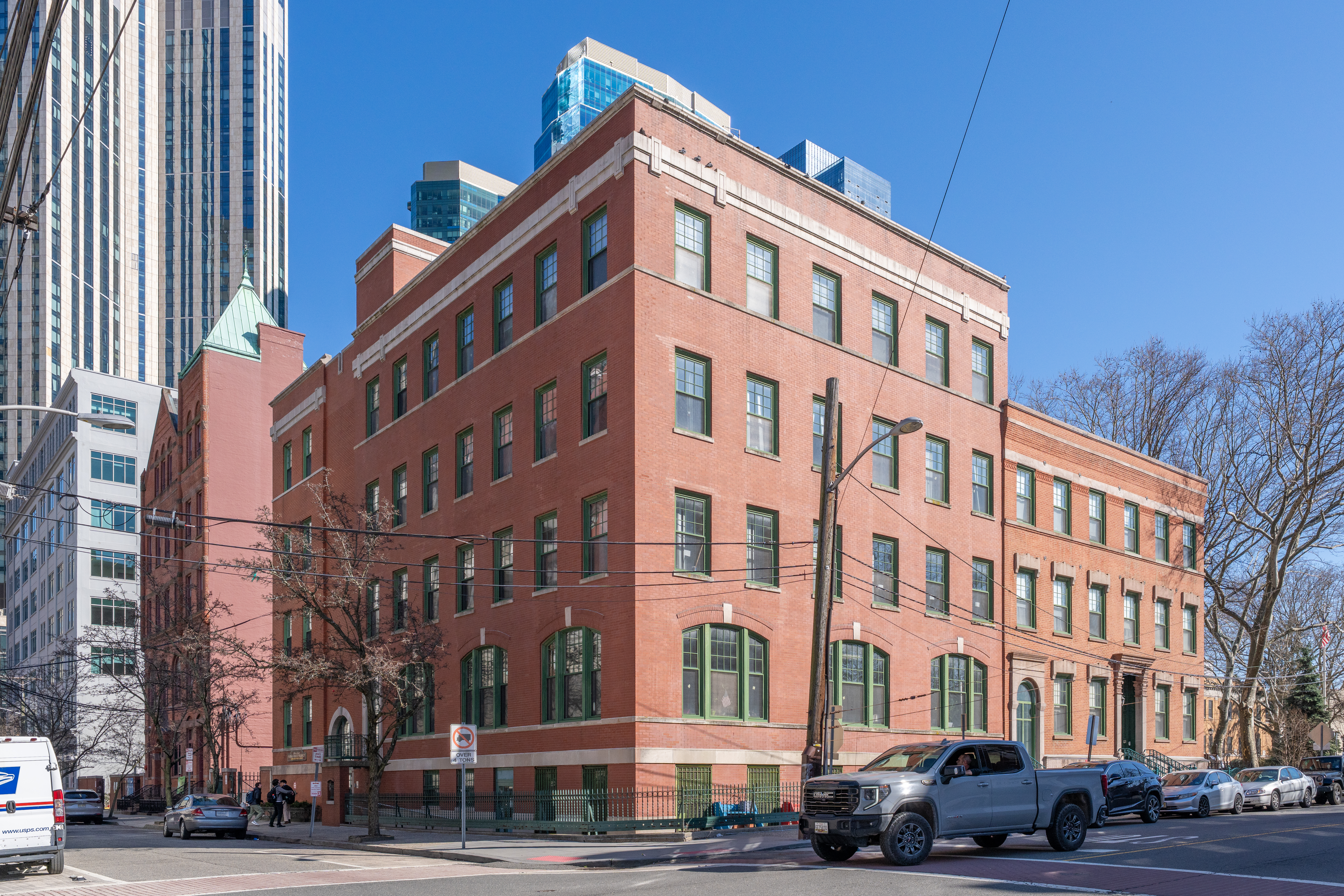

Location
- 89 York Street; Jersey City, (Hudson County), New Jersey 07302-3812; United States
- 40.715865°N 74.037258°W

Information
- Type: Private, All-Female
- Religious affiliation: Roman Catholic
- Established: 1989
- Director: Victoria Hayes
- Faculty: 10.9 FTEs
- Age range: 17+
- Enrollment: 121 (as of 2015-16)
- Student to teacher ratio: 11.1:1
- Accreditation: Middle States Association of Colleges and Schools
- Website: yorkstreetproject.org/our-programs/kenmare-high-school

Kenmare High School is an all-female, private, Roman Catholic high school in Jersey City, in Hudson County, New Jersey, United States. It is located within the Roman Catholic Archdiocese of Newark. The school has been accredited by the Middle States Association of Colleges and Schools Commission on Secondary Schools since 1992.

As of the 2015–16 school year, the school had an enrollment of 121 students and 10.9 classroom teachers (on an FTE basis), for a student–teacher ratio of 11.1:1. The school's student body was 49.6% Black, 14.1% Hispanic, 1.7% White, 0.8% Asian and 33.9% two or more races.

Kenmare is an alternative high school for young women (ages 17+) who have dropped out of other high schools. The school is operated through the York Street Project as part of an effort to reduce rates of poverty in households headed by women, through a program that offers small class sizes, individualized learning and development of life skills.
