= Robert Francis Garner =

Catholic bishop (1920–2000)

Most Reverend Robert F. Garner
- Auxiliary Bishop emeritus of Newark
- Church: Catholic Church
- See: Titular See of Blera
- Appointed: May 3, 1976
- In office: June 25, 1976 - June 11, 1995

Orders
- Ordination: June 15, 1946
- Consecration: June 25, 1976 by Peter Leo Gerety

Personal details
- Born: April 27, 1920 Jersey City, New Jersey
- Died: December 25, 2000 (aged 80)

Robert Francis Garner (April 27, 1920 – December 25, 2000) was a bishop of the Catholic Church in the United States. He served as an auxiliary bishop of the Archdiocese of Newark from 1976 to 1995.

== Biography ==
Born in Jersey City, New Jersey, Robert Garner was ordained a priest for the Archdiocese of Newark on June 15, 1946.

On May 3, 1976 Pope Paul VI appointed him as the Titular Bishop of Blera and Auxiliary Bishop of Newark. He was ordained a bishop by Archbishop Peter Gerety on June 25, 1976. The principal co-consecrators were Archbishop Emeritus Thomas Boland and Auxiliary Bishop Harold Perry, S.V.D. of New Orleans. Garner continued to serve as an auxiliary bishop until his resignation was accepted by Pope John Paul II on June 11, 1995. He died at the age of 80 on December 25, 2000.
