= Bure (diocese) =

Roman Catholic titular see

Bulnensis, also known as Bure, is a titular episcopal see of the Roman Catholic Church ascribed to the ecclesiastical province of Africa Proconsularis, as a suffragan of the Archdiocese of Carthage.

Very little is known of the ancient Christian diocese. The bishopric is mentioned in passing by Optatus of Milevi Only one bishop is known from antiquity and the exact location of Bure is not known, though it is thought to be in the region of Djebel-Gorra and was doubtless in Tunisia.

Bure ceased to function as a Catholic diocese with the arrival of the Islamic armies at the end of the 7th century and was only established as a titular diocese in 1933. Today Bure survives as a titular bishopric.

Known Bishops of Buritanus:

- Donataus (catholic bishop fl 411.)
- Jacques Teerenstra, (1949 – 1955 Appointed)
- Stephen Aloysius Leven (1955–1969)
- Secundo Tagliabue (1970–1976)
- Dominic Anthony Marconi (1976 Appointed – )

== Name ==
The name Bure is of unknown meaning. Bure is, however, common in Roman North Africa and appears as a component in the name of many important towns of the Roman province including Thrburnica, ThurboMaise and Saltus Burunitanus and Thingibba Bure to name but a few places. The recurrence of the name Bure in over two dozen places indicates that it did signify something important to the local population.

== See also ==
Tubursico-Bure
