= Joseph Abel Francis =

American Catholic bishop

The Most Reverend Joseph A. Francis SVD
- Auxiliary Bishop emeritus of Newark
- Church: Catholic Church
- See: Titular See of Valliposita
- Appointed: May 3, 1976
- In office: June 25, 1976 – June 30, 1995

Orders
- Ordination: October 7, 1950
- Consecration: June 25, 1976 by Peter Leo Gerety

Personal details
- Born: September 30, 1923 Lafayette, Louisiana, US
- Died: September 1, 1997 (aged 73)

Joseph Abel Francis Jr. SVD (1923–1997) was an American Catholic bishop who served as an auxiliary bishop for the Archdiocese of Newark from 1976 to 1995. He was a member of the Society of the Divine Word.

== Biography ==
Born on September 30, 1923, in Lafayette, Louisiana, Joseph Francis was the brother of the educator and scholar Norman Francis. Educated at St. Augustine Seminary (Bay St. Louis), Joseph was ordained a priest for the Society of the Divine Word on October 7, 1950. When he was ordained, he become only the 35th such African American.

On May 3, 1976, Pope Paul VI appointed him as the Titular Bishop of Valliposita and Auxiliary Bishop of Newark. He was consecrated by Archbishop Peter Gerety on June 25, 1976. The principal co-consecrators were Archbishop Emeritus Thomas Boland of Newark and Auxiliary Bishop Harold Perry of New Orleans.

Francis was an outspoken Civil Rights leader and was one of the first prelates in the Catholic church to openly speak out against racism. In the 1970s, he led the National Black Catholic Clergy Caucus, a fraternal organization dedicated to the spiritual, theological, educational, and ministerial growth of Black Catholic clergy.

Francis noted that his appointment as bishop was "the second great challenge" he faced during his life. The other was his founding of Verbum Dei High School in the Watts section of Los Angeles, a predominantly African American community. One of his other important works was his pastoral letter on racism, which was published in 1979. As of 2025, Francis remains the first and only African-American bishop in the Newark Archdiocese.

Francis continued to serve as an auxiliary bishop until his early retirement was accepted by Pope John Paul II on June 30, 1995. He died at the age of 73 on September 1, 1997.

== Resources and Links ==
Seton Hall University, Monsignor Noe Field Archives & Special Collections Center, Joseph A. Francis papers, Identifier # ADN 0003-011
