= Archdiocese of Newark =

Catholic archdiocese in the United States

Coordinates: 40°45′20″N 74°10′39″W

Archdiocese of Newark Archidiœcesis Novarcensis
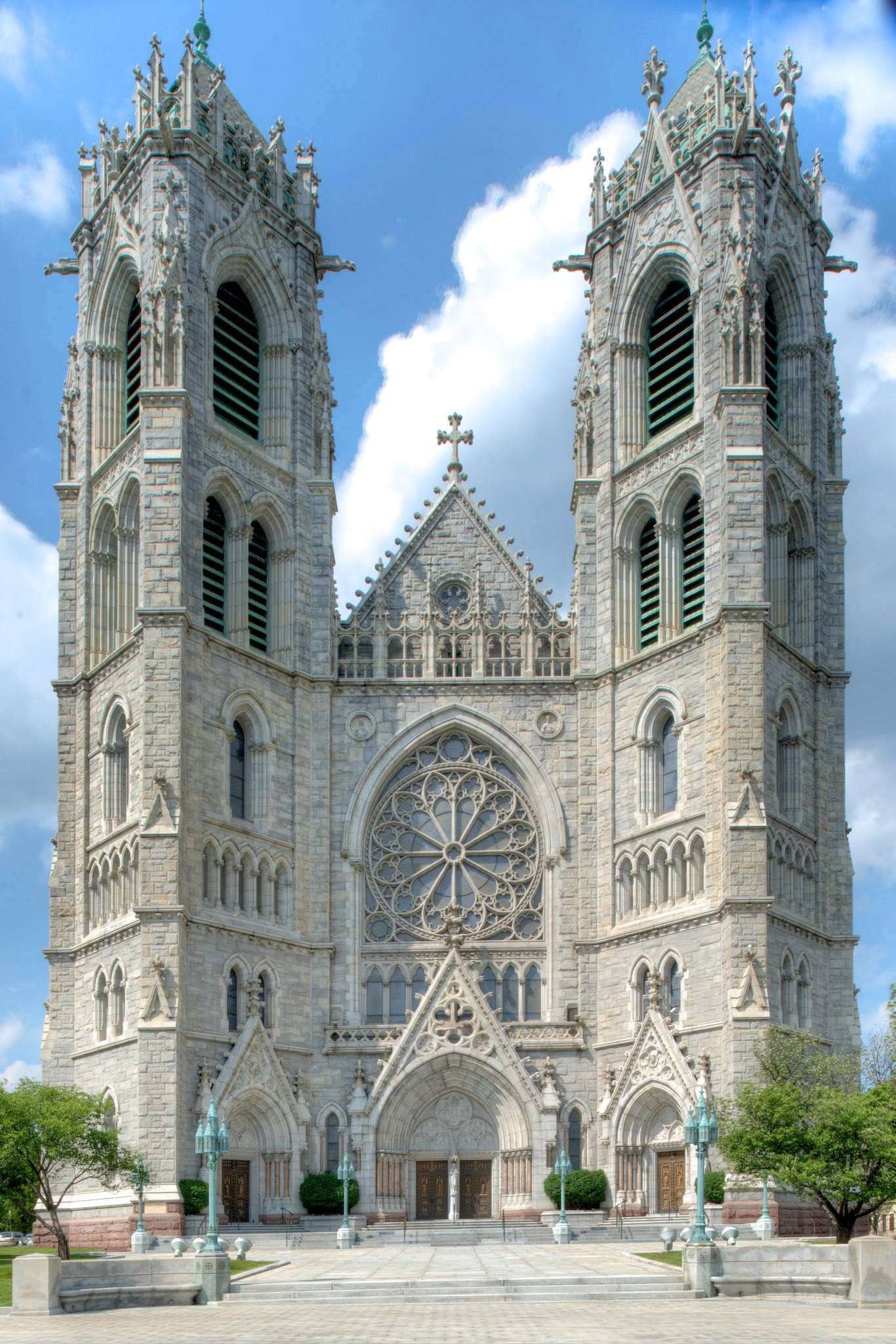
- Cathedral Basilica of the Sacred Heart

- Coat of Arms of the Archdiocese of Newark

Location
- Country: United States
- Territory: Counties of Bergen, Essex, Hudson and Union, New Jersey
- Ecclesiastical province: Newark
- Headquarters: Newark, New Jersey

Statistics
- Area: 1,328 km^{2} (513 sq mi)
- Population: Total; Catholics: (as of 2016); 3,179,276; 1,469,295 (46.2%)

Information
- Denomination: Catholic
- Sui iuris church: Latin Church
- Rite: Roman Rite
- Established: July 29, 1853; 173 years ago (became archdiocese, December 10, 1937)
- Cathedral: Cathedral Basilica of the Sacred Heart
- Patron saint: Our Lady of the Immaculate Conception

Current leadership
- Pope: Leo XIV
- Metropolitan Archbishop: Joseph W. Tobin
- Auxiliary Bishops: Manuel Aurelio Cruz; Elias R. Lorenzo; Pedro Bismarck Chau
- Vicar General: Very Reverend John J. Chadwick, S.T.D.
- Judicial Vicar: Very Rev. Raphael Lee, JCL
- Bishops emeritus: John Walter Flesey; Dominic Anthony Marconi; Gregory J. Studerus

Map
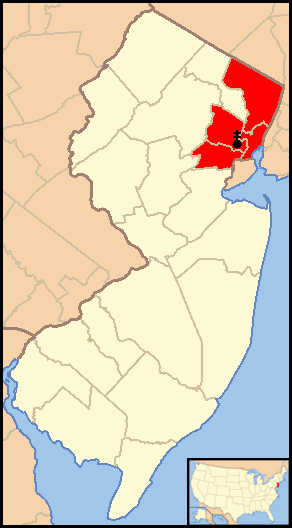

Website
- rcan.org

The Archdiocese of Newark (Latin: Archidiœcesis Novarcensis) is an archdiocese of the Catholic Church in northeastern New Jersey in the United States. The mother church is the Cathedral Basilica of the Sacred Heart in Newark. Cardinal Joseph Tobin is the archbishop.

== Territory ==
The Archdiocese of Newark is a metropolitan see with four suffragan dioceses in its ecclesiastical province. The suffragan dioceses are: Diocese of Camden, Diocese of Metuchen, Diocese of Paterson, Diocese of Trenton.

The archdiocese contains the following counties: Bergen, Union, Hudson, Essex.

== History ==
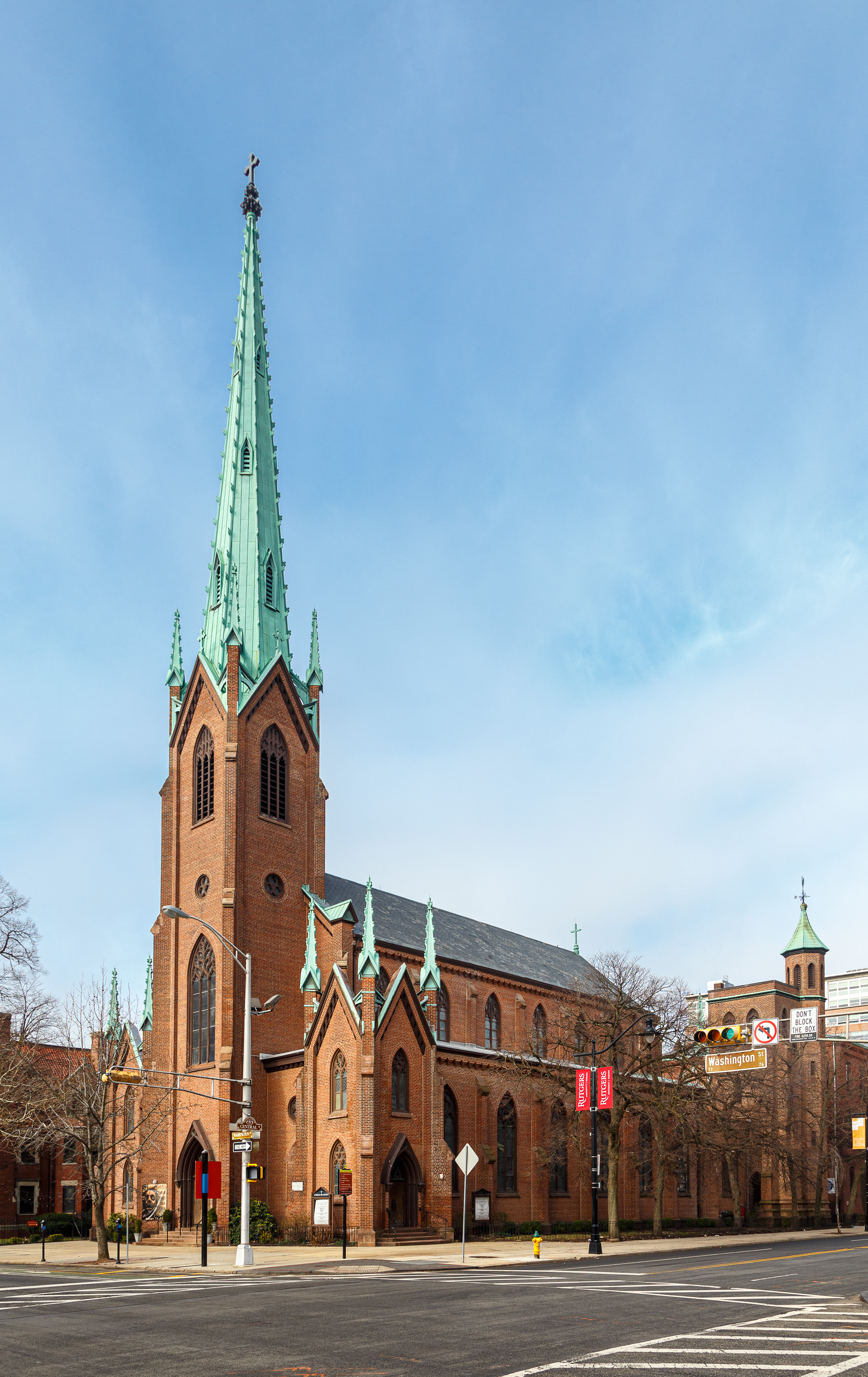
St. Patrick's Pro-Cathedral

=== 1672 to 1789 ===
During the 17th century, the British government divided present day New Jersey into separate provinces of East Jersey and West Jersey. East Jersey, which covered area belonging to the present Archdiocese of Newark, was hostile toward Catholics. The first priests to venture into East Jersey were Harvey and Gage, the chaplains of the Catholic governor of New York, Thomas Dongan. Starting in 1672, the priests made a few trips to Woodbridge and Elizabethtown to the few Catholics there. Some of these early Catholics were French immigrants who were employed at salt works.

However, in 1674, William Douglass was arrested in Elizabethtown and banished from East Jersey because he was a Catholic. In 1668, he had won a seat in the East Jersey provincial assembly, but was denied his seat due to his religion. East Jersey in 1698 granted religious toleration to all Christian faiths except Catholicism. The British Government combined East Jersey and West Jersey in 1702 into the Province of New Jersey.

During the 18th century, Robert Harding and Ferdinand Farmer from Philadelphia traveled across the province of New Jersey, ministering to Catholics at Mount Hope, Macopin, Basking Ridge, Trenton and Ringwood. The settlement of Macopin was founded by German Catholics sometime during this period.

The French envoy François Barbé-Marbois, writing from Philadelphia in 1785, estimated the Catholic population in the new States of New York and New Jersey at approximately 1700, with over half of them living in New Jersey. Many French refugees from the Haitian Revolution had settled in Elizabeth. Vianney, Tissorant, and Malou traveled to New Jersey from St. Peter's Parish in New York City to provide ministry. The opening of mines, furnaces, glass works, and other industries attracted more Catholic immigrants to New Jersey.

=== 1789 to 1853 ===
On November 6, 1789, Pope Pius VI elevated the Apostolic Prefecture of the United States to the new Diocese of Baltimore, including all of the new United States. On April 8, 1808, Pope Pius VII erected the Diocese of Philadelphia and the Diocese of New York, taking their territory from the Diocese of Baltimore.

- Sussex, Bergen, Morris, Essex, Somerset, Middlesex, and Monmouth counties in New Jersey became part of the Diocese of New York
- The rest of New Jersey became part of the Diocese of Philadelphia.

St. John's Parish, founded in 1826, was the first parish in Newark. In Jersey City, Saint Peter's Church was dedicated in 1831. Saint Mary of the Assumption Church, the first parish in Elizabeth, was started in 1844. Our Lady of Grace Parish was started in Hoboken in 1851.

=== 1853 to 1873 ===
In 1853, Pope Pius IX erected the Diocese of Newark, taking all of New Jersey from the Dioceses of New York and Philadelphia. The pope named James Bayley as the first bishop of Newark.

Having limited funds to operate the diocese, Bayley appealed to the Society for the Propagation of the Faith in Lyon, France for assistance in 1854. The Society gave him approximately 19,000 francs. He also received material assistance from the Leopoldine Society in Vienna. In 1855, Bayley estimated the number of Catholics in the diocese at 40,000, mainly Irish and German.

In 1856, Bayley opened Chegary Academy in Madison. The school moved in 1860 to South Orange, where it was incorporated in 1861 as Seton Hall College. The college also had a seminary. In 1857, a group of Benedictine Sisters arrived from Pennsylvania to establish schools in the diocese. The next year, Bayley sent five women to train with the Sisters of Charity. In 1872, Bayley became archbishop of Baltimore.

=== 1873 to 1900 ===
To replace Bayley, Pope Pius IX name Michael Corrigan of Newark as the second bishop of Newark in 1873. At that time, Catholic boys sent by the courts to state institutions were unable to attend mass. Corrigan offered clergy to provide that service, but the State of New Jersey refused. In response, he established the Denville Catholic Protectory School in Denville as an alternative to the state institutions. Catholic boys were taught skills and trades there. Corrigan also established a House of the Good Shepherd for Wayward Girls in 1875 in Newark. In 1880, a group of Dominican Nuns of the Perpetual Adoration arrived in Newark from France. Corrigan was named coadjutor archbishop for the Archdiocese of New York in 1880.

The next bishop of Newark was Winand Wigger, taking office in 1881. That same year, the pope erected the Diocese of Trenton, taking the southern portion of New Jersey from the Diocese of Newark. Shortly after his installation, Wigger remarked "In the Church of God there is no distinction of race, color or tongue." At the time of his consecration as a bishop, the diocese had 121 priests, 83 churches, 18,396 students enrolled in diocesan schools, and a Catholic population of 145,000.

After surveying the church property in the diocese, Wigger negotiated a $2 million loan to cover the mortgages on many churches. In 1883, he moved the Catholic Protectory from Danville to Mount Arlington and established the Sacred Heart Union to aid in its maintenance. Wigger was fiercely hostile to the sale of alcohol; in 1884, he ordered his priests to deny the last rites of the Church to anyone who sold alcohol to minors or those with alcohol abuse problems. The brewers in the diocese were generally German and the saloon keepers predominantly Irish, but some viewed Wigger's hostility to alcoholic beverages as having an anti-Irish bias.

Wigger also came in conflict with German Catholics who were attracted to non-Catholic societies and religions. He also became involved in the controversy stirred by the German Peter Cahensly over the alleged bias of Irish clergy in America against German Catholics. Wigger created German parishes, with their own schools for the preservation of German culture. Wigger held the fifth diocesan synod in November 1886, which enacted strict regulations on Catholic funerals and attendance at parochial and public schools. He even threatened to excommunicate Catholic parents who sent their children to public schools. Wigger unsuccessfully attempted to introduce state legislation to secure financial aid from the state for Catholic schools. In June 1899, Wigger laid the cornerstone for Cathedral of the Sacred Heart in Newark. Wigger died in 1901. By the time of his death, the diocese had 256 priests, 153 churches, 34,817 students, and 300,000 Catholics

=== 1900 to 1937 ===
In 1901, Monsignor John J. O'Connor of Newark was appointed the fourth bishop of Newark by Pope Leo XIII. During his tenure, the Catholic population of the diocese more than doubled, standing at over 683,000 by the time of his death. He increased the number of churches from 114 to 273, the number of priests from 265 to 712, and the number of Catholic school students from 35,330 to 82,462. O'Connor also established over 45 missions and chapels. He continued to oversee the construction of the Cathedral of the Sacred Heart. In 1903, O'Connor condemned the oath of the International Typographical Union and forbade Catholics from taking it, saying, "A man owes his allegiance first to God.

St. Clare's Hospital opened in Denville in 1918. Today it is Saint Clare’s Denville Hospital. In 1926, fear of automobile crashes prompted O'Connor to prohibit diocesan priests from owning or driving motor vehicles, except in rural parishes. O'Connor died in 1927.

The next bishop of Newark was Bishop Thomas Walsh from the Diocese of Trenton, appointed by Pope Pius XI in 1928. The following year, Walsh established the Newark Mount Carmel Guild to help those on public assistance. In 1930, the guild set up a soup kitchen in the basement of St. Patrick's Pro-Cathedral. In 1930, Walsh acquired the "Tower Hill", the estate of Louis C. Gillespie, founder of L.C. Gillespie & Sons. He invited the Religious Teachers Filippini to move to the diocese. The sisters relocated their motherhouse to Morristown and named it Villa Walsh. They opened a girls school, Villa Walsh Academy. In 1931, Walsh opened a new chancery building in Newark and in 1933 established Saint Gertrude Cemetery in Colonia. Walsh raised $2 million in 25 days to build Immaculate Conception Seminary in 1936, and encouraged Seton Hall Preparatory School and Seton Hall College to seek state accreditation.

=== 1937 to 1986 ===
In December 1937, Pius XI took the following actions:

- Erected the Diocese of Paterson, taking Morris, Sussex, and Passaic Counties from the Diocese of Newark
- Elevated the Diocese of Newark to the Archdiocese of Newark. The Dioceses of Camden, Paterson, and Trenton became suffragan sees of the new archdiocese.
- Named Walsh as the first archbishop of Newark.

After Walsh died in 1952, Pope Pius XII that same year named Bishop Thomas Boland from the Diocese of Paterson as the second archbishop of Newark. Boland founded St. Joseph Regional High School in Montvale, Immaculate Heart Academy in Washington Township, and Paramus Catholic High School in Paramus in the 1960s. In January 1969, a group of 20 priests of the archdiocese accused Boland of adopting a "white racist attitude" toward African Americans". In response, Boland issued a seven-page report that outlined the programs the archdiocese had taken in regard to African-Americans. Boland retired in 1974.

Bishop Peter Gerety from the Diocese of Portland was the third archbishop of Newark, appointed by Pope Paul VI in 1974. During his 12-year tenure in Newark, Gerety created the Office of Pastoral Renewal and began a ministry to divorced Catholics. The Office of Pastoral Renewal evolved into RENEW International, an organization based in Plainfield that provides resources for small Christian communities in the United States, Canada and Third World countries. Gerety established the Archbishop's Annual Appeal in 1975, and supported the charismatic and ecumenical movements. He also established a fund to advance studies in ecclesiastical history, especially the history of Catholicism in the United States.

In November 1981, Pope John Paul II erected the Diocese of Metuchen, designating it as a suffragan see of the Archdiocese of Newark.

=== 1986 to 2016 ===
Gerety retired in 1986. His replacement was Bishop Theodore McCarrick from the Diocese of Metuchen, named to Newark by Pope John Paul II in 1986. During his tenure, McCarrick established the Office of Evangelization, ministries for Hispanics and victims of HIV/AIDS, and a drug prevention program. He also ordained 200 priests for the archdiocese. McCarrick became known as an advocate for social justice, once saying, "[T]he Church cannot be authentic unless it takes care of the poor, the newcomers, the needy." He became archbishop of the Archdiocese of Washington in 2000.

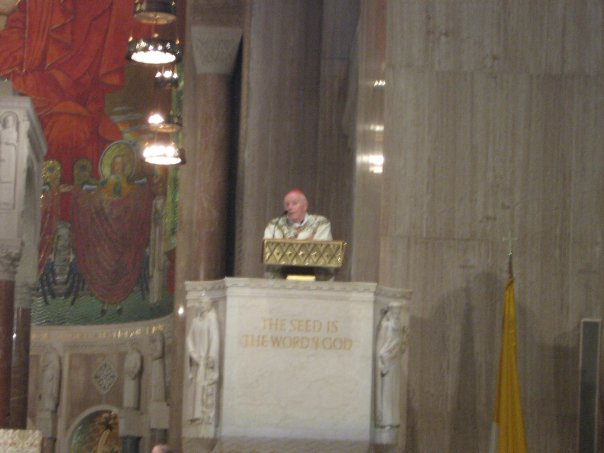
Archbishop McCarrick in June 2006

Bishop John J. Myers of the Diocese of Peoria replace McCarrick in 2001. Later that year, Myers banned eulogies at funeral masses in the archdiocese, saying that some eulogies were inappropriate and too long. After pushback from parishioners, he reversed himself. In 2004, Myers criticized a group of law students at Seton Hall University for honoring Supreme Court Justice Sandra Day O'Connor, objecting because she allegedly favored abortion rights for women.

In September 2013, Pope Francis named Bishop Bernard Hebda as coadjutor archbishop of the archdiocese to assist Myers. In February 2014, The New York Times reported that Myers planned to retire to a 7,500-foot so-called "palace", expanded at his direction in Pittstown. In June 2016, Francis named Hebda as the new archbishop of the Archdiocese of Saint Paul and Minneapolis. The pope did not replace Hebda with another coadjutor.

=== 2016 to present ===
When Myers retired in late 2016, Francis named Archbishop Joseph W. Tobin from the Archdiocese of Indianapolis to replace him. Tobin welcomed a "pilgrimage" of gay and lesbian Catholics and their families to Sacred Heart Cathedral in 2017. In an interview before the mass, Tobin said,

"The word I use is 'welcome'. These are people that have not felt welcome in other places. My prayer for them is that they do. Today in the Catholic Church, we read a passage that says you have to be able to give a reason for your hope. And I'm praying that this pilgrimage for them, and really for the whole Church, is a reason for hope."

In September 2021, the archdiocese broke ground on a new St. Lucy's Homeless Housing and Support Services Site in Jersey City. The project was designed to provide emergency and transitional housing, along with supportive services, for homeless individuals and families.

As of 2023, Joseph W. Tobin, by then a Cardinal, is the archbishop of the Archdiocese of Newark.

Tobin officiated the final solemn mass for Saint Andrews the Apostle Catholic Church in Bayonne on September 22, 2024. Established in 1914 by Andrew M. Egan, its construction began in 1922; it was dedicated by Bishop O’Connor. It was a worship venue for the Blessed Miriam Teresa Demjanovich. In 2016, when Saint Andrew and Saint Mary Parishes were merged, mass attendance had dropped by 35%.

=== Sexual abuse scandal ===
In August 2016, Kevin Gugliotta was arrested for possession of child pornography. Soon after his arrest, the archdiocese removed Gugliotta from public ministry. He pleaded guilty and in August 2017 was sentenced to an 11-year prison sentence.

In February 2019, the archdiocese released a list of 63 clergy with credible accusations of sexual abuse of minors since 1940. Cardinal Tobin also acknowledged that the alleged acts of abuse committed by the clergy listed were reported to law enforcement agencies. By 2020, the names of 86 accused clergy who served in the archdiocese were made public.

In December 2019, a new law went into effect in New Jersey that allowed some of McCarrick's alleged victims to file lawsuits against him and the archdiocese. As of December 2019, eight lawsuits had been filed against the archdiocese.

==== 2020 lawsuits against archdiocese ====
By February 2020, according to a New Jersey attorney, the five Catholic dioceses in the state had paid over $11 million to compensate 105 claims of sex abuse committed by clergy, of which 98 were compensated through settlements. America Magazine reported that the archdiocese and two other New Jersey dioceses had been making secret payments to victims of abuse by McCarrick since 2005. In July 2020, Northjersey.com reported that nine new sex abuse lawsuits had been filed against the archdiocese. The new lawsuits contained allegations of abuse by four archdiocese priests and three members of religious orders.

== Ministries ==
Jersey Catholic is the archdiocesan newspaper.

The Catholic Committee on Scouting (CCOS) offers support for Catholic scouting units chartered with archdiocesan parishes and schools.

== Bishops ==
=== Bishops of Newark ===
1. James Roosevelt Bayley (1853–1872), appointed Archbishop of Baltimore
2. Michael Corrigan (1873–1880), appointed Coadjutor Archbishop of New York and subsequently succeeded to that see
3. Winand Wigger (1881–1901)
4. John J. O'Connor (1901–1927)
5. Thomas J. Walsh (1928–1937), elevated to archbishop

=== Archbishops of Newark ===
1. Thomas J. Walsh (1937–1952)
2. Thomas Aloysius Boland (1953–1974)
3. Peter Leo Gerety (1974–1986)
4. Theodore Edgar McCarrick (1986–2000), appointed Archbishop of Washington
5. John J. Myers (2001–2016)
  - Bernard Hebda (coadjutor archbishop 2013–2016; concurrently Apostolic Administrator of the Archdiocese of St. Paul and Minneapolis 2015–2016), appointed Archbishop of St. Paul and Minneapolis
6. Cardinal Joseph William Tobin (2017–present)

=== Current auxiliary bishops ===
- Manuel Aurelio Cruz (2008–present)
- Elias R. Lorenzo (2020–present)
- Pedro Bismarck Chau (2025–present)

=== Former auxiliary bishops ===
- Thomas H. McLaughlin (1935–1937), appointed Bishop of Paterson
- William A. Griffin (1938–1940), appointed Bishop of Trenton
- Thomas Aloysius Boland (1940–1947), appointed Bishop of Paterson and later Archbishop of Newark
- Justin J. McCarthy (1954–1957), appointed Bishop of Camden
- Martin Walter Stanton (1957–1972)
- Joseph Arthur Costello (1963–1978)
- John Joseph Dougherty (1963–1982)
- Jerome Arthur Pechillo (1976–1991)
- Joseph Abel Francis (1976–1995)
- Robert Francis Garner (1976–1995)
- Dominic Anthony Marconi (1976–2002)
- David Arias Pérez (1983–2004)
- James T. McHugh (1987–1989), appointed Bishop of Camden and later Coadjutor Bishop and Bishop of Rockville Centre
- John Mortimer Smith (1988–1991), appointed Bishop of Pensacola-Tallahassee and later Coadjutor Bishop and Bishop of Trenton
- Michael Saltarelli (1990–1995), appointed Bishop of Wilmington
- Charles James McDonnell (1994–2004)
- Nicholas Anthony DiMarzio (1996–1999), appointed Bishop of Camden and later Bishop of Brooklyn
- Paul Gregory Bootkoski (1997–2002), appointed Bishop of Metuchen
- Arthur Serratelli (2000–2004), appointed Bishop of Paterson
- Edgar Moreira da Cunha (2003–2014), appointed Bishop of Fall River
- Gaetano Aldo Donato (2004–2015)
- John Walter Flesey (2004–2017)
- Gregory J. Studerus (2020–2025)
- Michael A. Saporito (2020-2026) Appointed Bishop of Metuchen

=== Other archdiocesan priests who became bishops ===
- Robert Seton, appointed titular archbishop of Heliopolis in Phoenicia in 1903
- Peter Baldacchino, appointed auxiliary bishop of Miami in 2014, later became Bishop of Las Cruces

== Schools ==
In May 2020, the Archdiocese of Newark announced that it would close nine elementary schools and Cristo Rey Newark High School in Newark due to financial problems. The archdiocese also noted that the it would have to pay approximately $80 million to keep all of its remaining elementary schools open for only five more years.

=== Seminaries ===
- Immaculate Conception (archdiocesan major seminary) at Seton Hall University – South Orange
- Saint Andrew's Hall college seminary at Seton Hall University – South Orange
- Redemptoris Mater Archdiocesan Missionary Seminary – Kearny

=== Higher education ===
- Caldwell University – Caldwell
- Felician University – Rutherford
- Saint Peter's University – Jersey City
- Seton Hall University – South Orange

=== High schools ===
==== Bergen County ====
- Academy of the Holy Angels – Demarest
- Bergen Catholic High School – Oradell
- Don Bosco Preparatory High School – Ramsey
- Immaculate Conception High School – Lodi
- Immaculate Heart Academy – Washington Township
- Paramus Catholic High School – Paramus
- St. Joseph Regional High School – Montvale
- St. Mary High School – Rutherford

==== Essex County ====
- Immaculate Conception High School – Montclair
- Lacordaire Academy – Upper Montclair
- Mount Saint Dominic Academy – Caldwell
- St. Benedict's Preparatory School – Newark
- St. Vincent Academy – Newark
- Seton Hall Preparatory School – West Orange

==== Hudson County ====
- Hudson Catholic Regional High School – Jersey City
- Kenmare High School – Jersey City
- St. Dominic Academy – Jersey City
- St. Peter's Preparatory School – Jersey City

* Alternative school financially independent of archdiocese.

==== Union County ====
- Mother Seton Regional High School – Clark
- Oak Knoll School of the Holy Child – Summit
- Oratory Preparatory School – Summit
- Roselle Catholic High School – Roselle
- Union Catholic Regional High School – Scotch Plains

=== Former high schools ===
- Immaculate Conception High School – Montclair (closed 2025)
- Benedictine Academy – Elizabeth (closed 2020)
- Christ the King Preparatory School – Newark (Closed 2020)
- Holy Family Academy – Bayonne (closed)
- Marist High School – Bayonne (closed 2020)
- Queen of Peace High School – North Arlington (closed 2017)
- St. Anthony High School – Jersey City (closed 2017)
- St. Mary of the Assumption High School – Elizabeth (closed 2019)
- Essex Catholic High School Newark NJ (Moved to East Orange and Closed 2003)

== Cemeteries ==
- Christ The King Cemetery – Franklin Lakes
- Gate of Heaven Cemetery – East Hanover
- Holy Cross Cemetery – North Arlington
- Holy Name Cemetery – Jersey City
- Holy Sepulchre Cemetery – East Orange
- Madonna Cemetery – Fort Lee
- Maryrest Cemetery – Mahwah
- Saint Gertrude's Cemetery – Colonia
- Saint Joseph's Cemetery – Lyndhurst

== Parishes ==
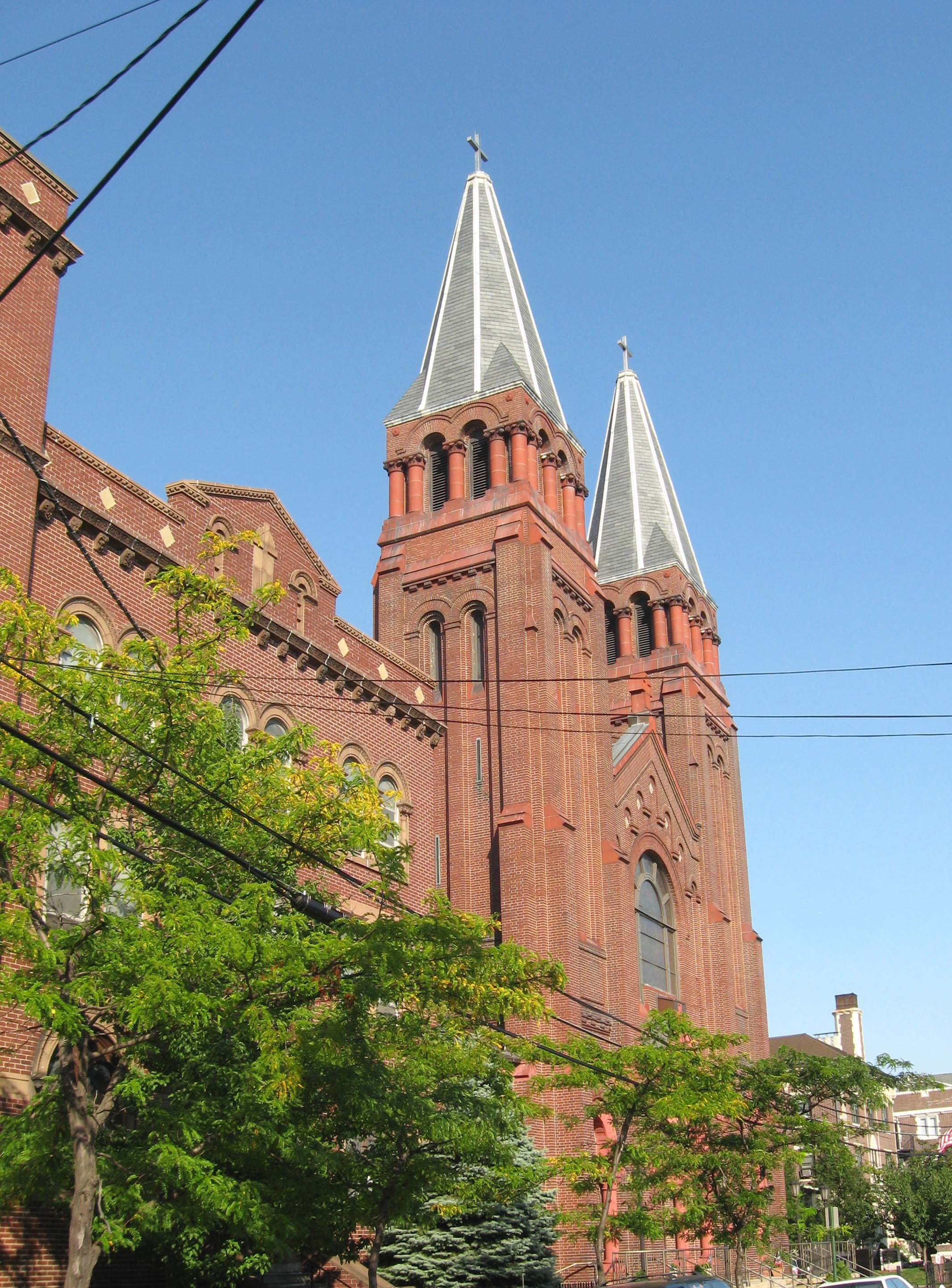
Our Lady of Mount Carmel – Bayonne

- Assumption Parish – Emerson
- Blessed Miriam Teresa Demjanovich Parish – Bayonne
- Blessed Sacrament Parish – Elizabeth
- Corpus Christi Parish – Hasbrouck Heights
- Christ the King Parish – Hillside
- Christ the King Parish – Jersey City
- Divine Mercy Parish - Rahway
- Epiphany Parish – Clark
- Good Shepherd Parish – Irvington
- Guardian Angel Parish – Allendale
- Holy Cross Parish – Harrison
- Holy Name of Jesus Parish – East Orange
- Holy Rosary Parish – Edgewater
- Holy Rosary Parish – Jersey City
- Holy Rosary/St. Michael Parish – Elizabeth
- Holy Spirit/O.L.Help of Christians Parish – East Orange
- Holy Trinity Parish – Fort Lee
- Holy Trinity Parish – Hackensack
- Immaculate Conception Parish – Elizabeth
- Immaculate Conception Parish – Hackensack
- Immaculate Heart of Mary/St. Patrick Parish – Elizabeth
- Immaculate Heart of Mary Parish – Newark
- Little Flower Parish – Berkeley Heights
- Madonna Parish – Fort Lee
- Most Blessed Sacrament Parish – Franklin Lakes
- Most Holy Name Parish – Garfield
- Our Lady of Czestochowa Parish – Harrison
- Our Lady of Czestochowa Parish – Jersey City
- Our Lady of Fátima Parish – Elizabeth
- Our Lady of Fátima Parish – Newark
- Our Lady of Grace Parish – Fairview
- Our Lady of Grace/St. Joseph Parish – Hoboken
- Our Lady of Mercy Parish – Jersey City
- Our Lady of Mount Carmel Parish – Jersey City
- Our Lady of Mount Carmel Parish – Newark
- Our Lady of Mount Virgin Parish – Garfield
- Our Lady of Perpetual Help – Oakland
- Our Lady of Sorrows Parish – Jersey City
- Our Lady of Sorrows Parish – Kearny
- Our Lady of Sorrows Parish — South Orange
- Our Lady of Victories Parish – Jersey City
- Resurrection Parish – Jersey City
- Sacred Heart of Jesus Parish – Irvington
- Sacred Heart Parish – Bloomfield
- Sacred Heart Parish – Haworth
- St. Adalbert/Ss. Peter & Paul Parish – Elizabeth
- St. Aedan: St. Peter's University Church – Jersey City
- St. Agnes Parish – Clark
- St. Anne Parish – Fair Lawn
- St. Anne Parish – Garwood
- St. Anne Parish – Jersey City
- St. Ann Parish – Hoboken
- St. Ann Parish (Polish) – Jersey City
- St. Aloysius Parish – Caldwell
- St. Aloysius Parish – Jersey City
- St. Aloysius Parish – Newark
- St. Anthony of Padua Parish – Elizabeth
- St. Anthony of Padua Parish – Jersey City
- St. Anthony Parish – East Newark
- St. Benedict Parish – Newark
- St. Catharine Parish – Glen Rock
- St. Catherine of Siena Parish – Cedar Grove
- St. Catherine of Siena Parish – Hillside
- St. Cecilia Parish – Englewood
- St. Cecilia Parish – Kearny
- St. Elizabeth of Hungary Parish – Wyckoff
- St. Francis of Assisi Parish – Hackensack
- St. Francis of Assisi Parish – Hoboken
- St. Genevieve Parish – Elizabeth
- St. Hedwig Parish – Elizabeth
- St. Henry Parish – Bayonne
- St. James — Springfield
- St. James – Newark
- St. John the Apostle Parish – Clark
- St. John the Baptist Parish – Fairview
- St. John the Baptist Parish – Hillsdale
- St. John the Baptist Parish – Jersey City
- St. John the Evangelist Parish – Bergenfield
- St. John Paul II Parish – Bayonne
- St. Joseph Parish – Bogota
- St. Joseph Parish – Demarest
- St. Joseph Parish – East Orange
- St. Joseph Parish – East Rutherford
- St. Joseph Parish – Hackensack
- St. Joseph Parish – Jersey City
- St. Leo Parish – Elmwood Park
- St. Leo Parish – Irvington
- St. Luke Parish – Hohokus
- St. Mary of the Assumption Parish – Elizabeth
- St. Mary Parish – Closter
- St. Mary Parish – Dumont
- St. Mary Parish – Jersey City
- St. Michael Parish – Cranford
- St. Michael Parish – Jersey City
- St. Nicholas Parish – Jersey City
- St. Patrick and Assumption/All Saints Parish – Jersey City
- St. Paul of the Cross Parish – Jersey City
- St. Paul the Apostle Parish – Jersey City
- SS Peter and Paul Parish – Hoboken
- St. Peter Parish – Belleville
- St. Rose of Lima — Short Hills
- St. Stanislaus Kostka Parish – Garfield
- St. Stephen Parish – Kearny
- St. Teresa of Avila Parish - Summit
- St. Therese of Lisieux Parish – Cresskill
- St. Thomas More Parish – Fairfield
- St. Thomas the Apostle Parish – Bloomfield
- St. Valentine Parish – Bloomfield
- St. Vincent de Paul Parish – Bayonne

== See also ==
- LT John P. Washington – Chaplain, USA – one of the Four Chaplains killed during World War II
- Major Charles J. Watters, Chaplain, USA – killed in Vietnam War; awarded the Medal of Honor posthumously
- Byzantine Catholic Eparchy of Passaic
- Syrian Catholic Eparchy of Our Lady of Deliverance of Newark
- List of the Catholic cathedrals of the United States
- List of the Catholic dioceses of the United States
- Plenary Councils of Baltimore
- Catholic Church in the United States
- Catholic Church and politics in the United States
- History of Roman Catholicism in the United States
