= John Walter Flesey =

American prelate (born 1942)

His Excellency, The Most Reverend John Walter Flesey
- Auxiliary Bishop Emeritus of Newark; Titular Bishop of Allegheny
- Church: Roman Catholic Church
- Archdiocese: Newark
- Appointed: May 21, 2004
- Installed: August 4, 2004
- Retired: October 16, 2017
- Other post: Titular Bishop of Allegheny

Orders
- Ordination: May 13, 1978 by Thomas Aloysius Boland
- Consecration: August 4, 2004 by John J. Myers, Michael Angelo Saltarelli, and Arthur J. Serratelli

Personal details
- Born: August 6, 1942 (age 83) Jersey City, New Jersey, US
- Motto: My spirit rejoices

Styles of John Walter Flesey
- Reference style: His Excellency; The Most Reverend
- Spoken style: Your Excellency
- Religious style: Bishop

John Walter Flesey (born August 6, 1942) is an American prelate of the Roman Catholic Church. Flesey served as an auxiliary bishop of the Archdiocese of Newark in New Jersey from 2004 to 2017.

== Biography ==
=== Early life ===
John Flesey was born on August 6, 1942, in Jersey City, New Jersey to Joseph and Mary MacIsaac. He attended St. Aedan’s Grammar School, then went to St. Peter's Preparatory School, both in Jersey City. In 1964, Flesey received a Bachelor of History degree from St. Peter's College in Jersey City.

After graduating from college, Flesey entered Immaculate Conception Seminary at Seton Hall University in South Orange, New Jersey, remaining there until 1969. During this period, he received a Master of Pastoral Counseling degree from Iona College in New Rochelle, New York, and a Bachelor of Sacred Theology degree from Catholic University of America in Washington, D.C.

=== Priesthood ===
On May 31, 1969, Flesey was ordained a priest by Archbishop Thomas Aloysius Boland for the Archdiocese of Newark. After his ordination, Flesey was assigned to pastoral work at St. Bernard of Clairvaux Parish in Plainfield, New Jersey, spending 14 years there. In 1983, he entered the Pontifical Gregorian University in Rome, obtaining a Licentiate in Sacred Theology in 1985. Returning to New Jersey, Flesey was assigned to Immaculate Conception Seminary as a faculty member.

In 1990, Flesey returned to Rome to obtain his Doctor of Sacred Theology degree from the Pontifical University of Saint Thomas Aquinas. Back in New Jersey, he returned to teaching at the seminary and in 1995 was appointed rector, serving for five years. After a sabbatical year in Italy, Flesey was appointed director of ongoing formation for the priests in the archdiocese. He also returned to work at the seminary as spiritual director.

=== Auxiliary Bishop of Newark ===
On May 21, 2004, Pope John Paul II appointed Flesey as an auxiliary bishop of Newark as well as titular bishop of Allegheny. He was consecrated at Cathedral Basilica of the Sacred Heart in Newark, New Jersey, by Archbishop John Myers on August 4, 2004.

As auxiliary bishop, Flesey served as regional bishop of Bergen County, New Jersey, and as pastor of Most Blessed Sacrament Parish in Franklin Lakes, New Jersey.

=== Retirement ===
On October 16, 2017, Pope Francis accepted Flesey's letter of resignation as auxiliary bishop of Newark, submitted when Flesey reached the mandatory retirement age of 75, as required under canon law.

== See also ==
- Catholic Church in the United States
- Historical list of the Catholic bishops of the United States
- List of Catholic bishops of the United States

Catholic Church titles
Preceded by –	Auxiliary Bishop of Newark; 2004–2017	Succeeded by –
Preceded by Robert Joseph McManus	Roman Catholic Titular See of Allegheny; 2004–present	Succeeded by incumbent
