= David Arias Pérez =

Spanish-born Recollect friar

His Excellency, The Most Reverend David Arias Pérez OAR
- Auxiliary Bishop emeritus of Newark; Titular Bishop of Badiae
- Archdiocese: Newark
- Appointed: 25 January 1983
- Installed: 7 April 1983
- Term ended: 21 May 2004
- Other post: Titular Bishop of Badiae

Orders
- Ordination: 13 May 1952
- Consecration: 7 April 1984 by Peter Leo Gerety, Joseph Thomas O'Keefe, and Alphonse Gallegos

Personal details
- Born: 22 July 1929 Mataluenga, Spain
- Died: 9 May 2019 (aged 89) Teaneck, New Jersey, U.S.
- Denomination: Roman Catholic
- Education: Teresianum Institute
- Motto: Pascere populum suum

Styles of David Arias Pérez
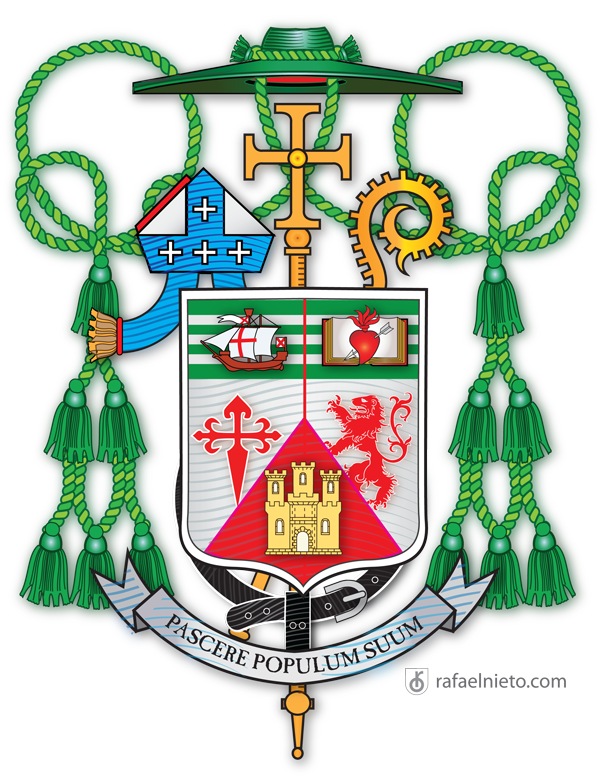
- Reference style: His Excellency; The Most Reverend
- Spoken style: Your Excellency
- Religious style: Bishop

David Arias Pérez OAR (22 July 1929 – 9 May 2019) was a Spanish-born Recollect friar who served as an auxiliary bishop of the Archdiocese of Newark from 1983 to 2004.

== Biography ==
Born in Mataluenga, part of the municipality of Las Omañas, in the Province of Leon, Spain, Arias entered the Order of Augustinian Recollects in 1946. He began his seminary studies in 1948 in Monachil and was ordained a priest in Barcelona on 31 May 1952. He was then assigned to teach Natural Sciences briefly in a local school, before beginning advanced studies in theology at the Teresianum Institute in Rome, where he received a Diploma in 1964.

He was sent by the Order to serve in their houses in North America, first in Mexico City, then in Kansas City, Kansas. He taught ascetical theology and was a master of clerics at the seminary of the Order there.

On 25 January 1983, he was appointed by Pope John Paul II as auxiliary bishop for the Archdiocese of Newark and was consecrated on the following 7 April. He was entrusted with the pastoral care of the growing Hispanic population of the region, representing their interests in various situations on the national level. Arias retired from this office on 21 May 2004.

In 2008, on the 25th anniversary of his consecration as bishop, his hometown of Villaviciosa de la Ribera in Leon was renamed the town square in his honor.

== Bibliography ==
- Rafael Lazcano, Episcopologio agustiniano. Agustiniana, Guadarrama (Madrid), 2014, vol. I, p. 592-596.

== See also ==
- Catholic Church hierarchy
- Catholic Church in the United States
- Historical list of the Catholic bishops of the United States
- List of Catholic bishops of the United States
- Lists of patriarchs, archbishops, and bishops

Catholic Church titles
Preceded by –	Auxiliary Bishop of Newark; 1983-2004	Succeeded by –
