= Peter Cahensly =

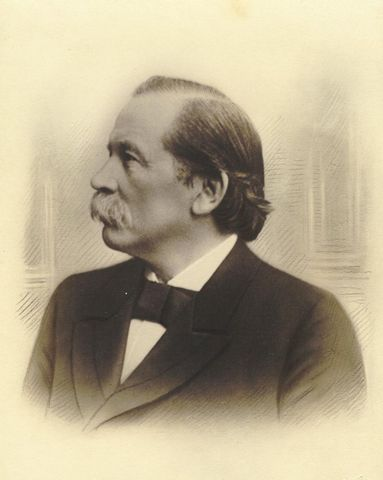
Cahensly Peter Paul

Peter Paul Cahensly (1838–1923), a German merchant who lived in the Hessian town Limburg an der Lahn. He was a member of the German Reichstag and a wealthy lay officer of the Roman Catholic Church.

During 1866, Cahensly noted that German immigrants to America were vulnerable due to poverty or cultural isolation, and suggested to the Catholic Congress meeting at Trier that a society should be established for the systematic protection of German emigrants at both the place of departure and the port of landing. He claimed that many were ending their relationship with Roman Catholicism, part of the problem being the domination of Roman Catholicism in America by English-speaking Irish clerics who were typically unsympathetic with the idea of preserving German culture among German immigrants, some of whom began attending German-speaking Lutheran congregations.

As a result of his urging, the Mainz Katholikentag of 1871 initiated the St. Raphaelsverein zum Schutz deutscher katholischer Auswanderer (de), an aid organization for German Catholic emigrants. The activities of the St. Raphaelsverein resulted in increased controversy about "Americanism" of the Catholic Church in the United States. Cahensly also urged the reorganization of the church in the United States, particularly the formation of ethnicity-based parishes and the appointment of German bishops; such ideas were opposed by many of the Irish-American Catholic clergy.

When, during the 1920s, the Vatican administration urged the creation of an African-American seminary, the American hierarchy reacted strongly to what one bishop termed "African Cahenslyism" .
