= Peter Leo Gerety =

Catholic archbishop

His Excellency, The Most Reverend Peter Leo Gerety
- Archbishop of Newark
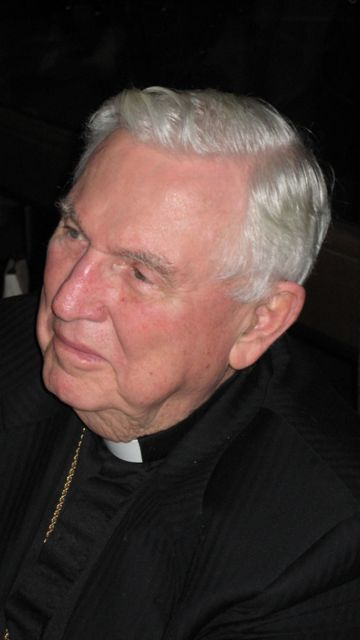
- See: Archdiocese of Newark
- Appointed: March 25, 1974
- Installed: June 28, 1974
- Term ended: June 3, 1986
- Predecessor: Thomas Aloysius Boland
- Successor: Theodore Edgar McCarrick
- Other posts: Coadjutor Bishop of Portland (1966–69); Bishop of Portland (1969–74)

Orders
- Ordination: June 29, 1939
- Consecration: June 1, 1966 by Henry Joseph O'Brien

Personal details
- Born: July 19, 1912 Shelton, Connecticut, U.S.
- Died: September 20, 2016 (aged 104) Totowa, New Jersey, U.S.
- Denomination: Roman Catholic Church
- Motto: In omnibus Christ (In all circumstances, give thanks)

Ordination history of Peter Leo Gerety
History
Episcopal consecration
- Consecrated by: Henry Joseph O'Brien (Hartford)
Episcopal succession
Bishops consecrated by Peter Leo Gerety as principal consecrator
- Edward Cornelius O'Leary: January 25, 1971
- Joseph Abel Francis, S.V.D.: June 25, 1976
- Robert Francis Garner: June 25, 1976
- Dominic Anthony Marconi: June 25, 1976
- Frank Joseph Rodimer: February 28, 1978
- David Arias Pérez, O.A.R.: April 7, 1983

Peter Leo Gerety (July 19, 1912 – September 20, 2016) was an American Catholic prelate who served as Archbishop of Newark from 1974 to 1986. He previously served as Bishop of Portland in Maine from 1969 to 1974. Gerety was the oldest living Catholic bishop in the world at the time of his death at age 104.

== Early life and education ==
Peter Gerety was born on July 19, 1912, in Shelton, Connecticut, the oldest of nine sons of Peter Leo and Charlotte Ursula (née Daly) Gerety. Since there were no local Catholic schools, he received his early education at public schools in Shelton, including Commodore Isaac Hull School and the Ferry Street School. He graduated from Shelton High School in 1929, and then worked for the U.S. Department of Agriculture and the New Jersey Department of Transportation for three years.

In 1932, Gerety began his studies for the priesthood at St. Thomas Seminary in Bloomfield, Connecticut. He continue his studies at the Saint-Sulpice Seminary in Issy-les-Moulineaux, France, in 1934.

== Priesthood ==
On June 29, 1939, Gerety was ordained a priest for the Diocese of Hartford at the Cathedral of Notre Dame in Paris. Following his return to Connecticut, he was assigned as a curate at St. John the Evangelist Parish in New Haven, Connecticut. In addition to his duties at St. John's, he served as a chaplain at Grace-New Haven Hospital in New Haven. In 1942, Gerety was appointed a curate at St. Brendan Parish and the director of Blessed Martin de Porres Center, both in New Haven. The center was an interracial social and religious organization that ministered to the African American Catholic community. In 1956, the center became St. Martin de Porres Parrish and Gerety was named its first pastor.

During his tenure at St. Martin's, Gerety became an outspoken advocate for the American Civil Rights Movement and supported programs to eliminate poverty. In 1963, he was chosen as coordinator and director of the Diocesan Priests' Conference on Interracial Justice.

== Episcopacy ==
=== Bishop of Portland ===
On March 4, 1966, Gerety was appointed coadjutor bishop of the Diocese of Portland and titular bishop of Crepedula by Pope Paul VI. He received his episcopal consecration on June 1, 1966, from Archbishop Henry O'Brien, with Bishop Daniel Feeney and Bishop John Hackett serving as co-consecrators, at the Cathedral of St. Joseph in Hartford.

Due to the failing health of Bishop Feeney, Gerety became apostolic administrator of the diocese on February 18, 1967, assuming responsibility for the daily activities of the diocese. Upon the death of Bishop Feeney on September 15, 1969, Gerety succeeded him as the eighth Bishop of Portland.

During his tenure in Portland, he implemented what were perceived to be the liturgical reforms of the Second Vatican Council by modernizing the Cathedral of the Immaculate Conception, through the removal of the high altar, cathedra, pulpit, and communion rail. He also provided housing for the elderly and expanded the Diocesan Bureau of Human Relations.

In 1969, Gerety led a campaign against a bill in the state legislature to legalize abortions That same year, he called on Maine food retailers to stop selling California grapes, in support of the United Farm Workers' dispute with growers. Gerety was one of 14 bishops in New England to sign a statement in 1973 endorsing a boycott of California-grown lettuce in a similar dispute. He also defended the rights of conscientious objectors during the Vietnam War and appealed to the Maine congressional delegation to modify the Selective Service Act.

=== Archbishop of Newark ===
Following the retirement of Archbishop Thomas Boland, Gerety was appointed the third Archbishop of Newark, New Jersey, on April 2, 1974. His installation took place at the Cathedral of the Sacred Heart on June 28 of that year. While his predecessor lived in the Llewellyn Park section of West Orange, Gerety took up residence in Nawark.

During his 12-year tenure in Newark, Gerety created the Office of Pastoral Renewal and began a ministry to divorced Catholics. The Office of Pastoral Renewal evolved into RENEW International, an organization now based in Plainfield, New Jersey, that provides resources for small Christian communities in the United States, Canada, Latin America, and South Africa. Gerety established the Archbishop's Annual Appeal in 1975, and supported the charismatic and ecumenical movements. He also established the Archbishop Gerety Fund for Ecclesiastical History to advance studies in ecclesiastical history, especially the history of Catholicism in the United States.

In 1976, Gerety sent a letter to the Democratic National Convention to protest the party's platform on abortion, which he described as "the bloody horror of the callous elimination of hundreds of thousands of God's most defenseless little ones, our own flesh and blood." That same year, he testified before the Senate Foreign Relations Committee on "U.S. Foreign Policy: A Critique from Catholic Tradition," and in 1977 he represented the United States Catholic Conference before the House Ways and Means Committee to offer his view on President Jimmy Carter's "Better Jobs and Income" proposal.

A year prior to his resignation, the archbishop addressed the charismatic covenant community known as the People of Hope, a branch of the Sword of the Spirit. In 1984, the Archbishop had asked People of Hope to submit statutes to bring them into a canonical relationship with the archdiocese. The community responded positively. On December 8, 1985, Gerety addressed the People of Hope at length, informing them of the process they would be involved in over the next year to bring them into compliance with his expectations of a Catholic organization approved by the archdiocese. The People of Hope, however, claimed they were not subject to his authority as they were members of the Sword of the Spirit, an umbrella organization of Covenant Communities out of Ann Arbor, Michigan. Robert Gallic, a coordinator for People of Hope, withdrew the 1984 statutes. Gerety's retirement in 1986 was viewed by many in Sword of the Spirit as a victory.

== Later life ==
Gerety submitted his letter of resignation as Archbishop of Newark to Pope John Paul II on June 3, 1986. At that time, he declared,

"It is well known that a bishop must resign at the age of 75. I will be 74 years old next month and I told the Holy Father in my letter of resignation that for the good of God's Church and for my own peace of mind, I believe it is time of a younger man to take over the reins of office here in Newark. I have done my best and I am very happy now to step aside."

He was succeeded by then Bishop Theodore McCarrick. Gerety died in Totowa, New Jersey, on September 20, 2016, aged 104, and was the world's oldest living Catholic bishop at the time.

== Legacy ==
On May 11, 2013, the Archdiocese of Newark settled two lawsuits by men who were abused as children by Carmen Sita, a priest at St. Aloysius Parish in Jersey City, New Jersey. Five men were abused in the 1970s by Sita, who in 1982 pleaded guilty to sexual assault. Gerety then allowed Sita to legally change his name to Gerald Howard and move to Missouri. Gerety never notified the Diocese of Jefferson City about Sita's name change or his conviction. Sita then abused at least three more children in Missouri. The Archdiocese of Newark agreed to pay $650,000 to the five New Jersey victims and $225,000 to one Missouri victim.

On May 11, 2021, a woman filed a $50 million lawsuit against the Archdiocese of Newark. The plaintiff claimed that Gerety had sexually abused her starting in 1976 three or four times when she was five years old. Gerety had been bringing extra food to the family and babysitting the young girl. The New Jersey Independent Victim Compensation Program had investigated her claims, but did not find them credible. The program had offered her a $5,000 settlement, which she rejected.

Catholic Church titles
Preceded by Daniel Joseph Feeney	Bishop of Portland; 1969 - 1974	Succeeded by Edward Cornelius O'Leary
Preceded by Thomas Aloysius Boland	Archbishop of Newark; 1974 - 1986	Succeeded by Theodore Edgar McCarrick
