= Immaculate Conception Seminary School of Theology =

Catholic Seminary at Seton Hall University in New Jersey, U.S.

- Motto: Latin: Dispensatores mysteriorum Dei (Dispensers of the mysteries of God)
- Type: Private
- Established: 1861; 165 years ago
- Parent institution: Seton Hall University
- Accreditation: Association of Theological Schools in the United States and Canada
- Rector: Reverend Monsignor Gerard H. McCarren, S.T.D.
- Administrative staff: 20
- Students: Approximately 245
- Location: South Orange, New Jersey, U.S.
- Campus: Urban
- Website: theology.shu.edu

The Immaculate Conception Seminary School of Theology (ICSST) is the major seminary for the Roman Catholic Archdiocese of Newark and is part of Seton Hall University, a Roman Catholic university located in South Orange, New Jersey.

== History ==
ICSST is one of the oldest Catholic seminaries in the United States. Seton Hall is the oldest diocesan university in the country. ICSST admits lay persons, as well as seminarians, as students. In addition to a Seminary Formation Program to prepare men for priesthood, ICSST has a renowned graduate program offering the following degrees:

- Master of Arts in Theology (MA)
- Master of Arts in Pastoral Ministry (MAPM)
- Master of Divinity (M.Div.)

The school attracts students from all over the world and in 2006 created a bachelor's degree program in Catholic Theology.

The school also offers certificates in Christian Spirituality and Catholic Evangelization.

== Notable alumni ==
- Michael Angelo Saltarelli, former Bishop of Wilmington
- Peter Baldacchino, an Auxiliary Bishop of Miami
- John P. Washington, one of the Four Chaplains, who died in World War II
- Michael A. Saporito, the sixth bishop of the Diocese of Metuchen
