= Cathedral Basilica of the Sacred Heart (Newark) =

Roman Catholic cathedral in Newark, New Jersey, US

Coordinates: 40.7549°N 74.1784°W

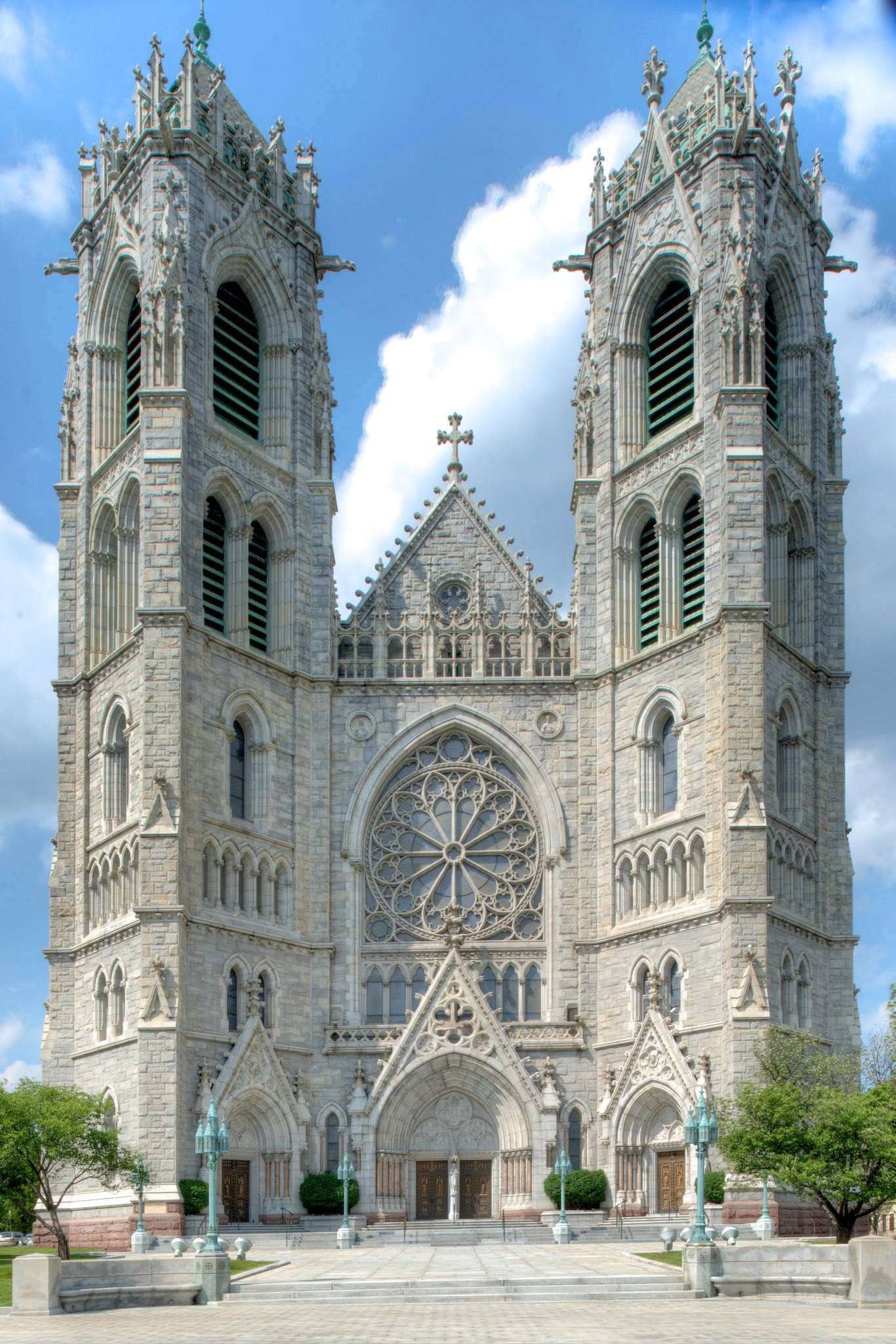
- The Great Rose Window over the entrance to the Cathedral Basilica of the Sacred Heart in Newark, New Jersey is the largest of any Catholic church in the Western Hemisphere.
- Cathedral Basilica of the Sacred Heart
- Location: 89 Ridge Street; Newark, New Jersey, U.S.
- Country: United States
- Denomination: Catholic Church
- Sui iuris church: Latin Church
- Website: www.cathedralbasilica.org

History
- Status: Cathedral, minor basilica
- Consecrated: October 19, 1954

Architecture
- Functional status: Active
- Style: French Gothic Revival
- Years built: 1898-1954

Specifications
- Length: 365 feet (111 m)
- Width: 165 feet (50 m)

Administration
- Archdiocese: Newark

Clergy
- Archbishop: Joseph Card. Tobin
- Rector: Rev. Matthew Gonzalez
- Cathedral of the Sacred Heart
- U.S. National Register of Historic Places
- Area: 3.6 acres (1.5 ha)
- NRHP reference No.: 76001151
- Added to NRHP: December 22, 1976

The Cathedral Basilica of the Sacred Heart, the fifth-largest cathedral in North America, is the seat of the Roman Catholic Archdiocese of Newark. Headed by Cardinal Tobin for the archdiocese, it is located in the Lower Broadway neighborhood of Newark, New Jersey. Catholic Mass is offered daily and three times on Sunday in English and in Spanish. Noon Sunday Mass is conducted in English with the Cathedral choir.

== Background ==
The building, facing Branch Brook Park, is generally regarded as the "most perfect and exact example of French Gothic architecture in the Western Hemisphere." Construction began in 1899 and was finished in 1954. The original design called for an English-Irish Gothic Revival church, but plans were later modified in favor of a French Gothic Revival style.

Many art historians consider the cathedral's stained glass to be the second finest in the world, after the Chartres Cathedral. Large circular rose windows of stained glass by the Zettler studio adorn the structure. The 36-foot rose window over the primary entrance is the largest such window in the Catholic Church in the Western Hemisphere.

The building is roughly the size of Westminster Abbey, with towers higher than those of that structure as well as those of the Cathedral of Notre-Dame.

It is home to the largest pipe organ ever built by the Schantz Organ Company, also the largest church organ in New Jersey.

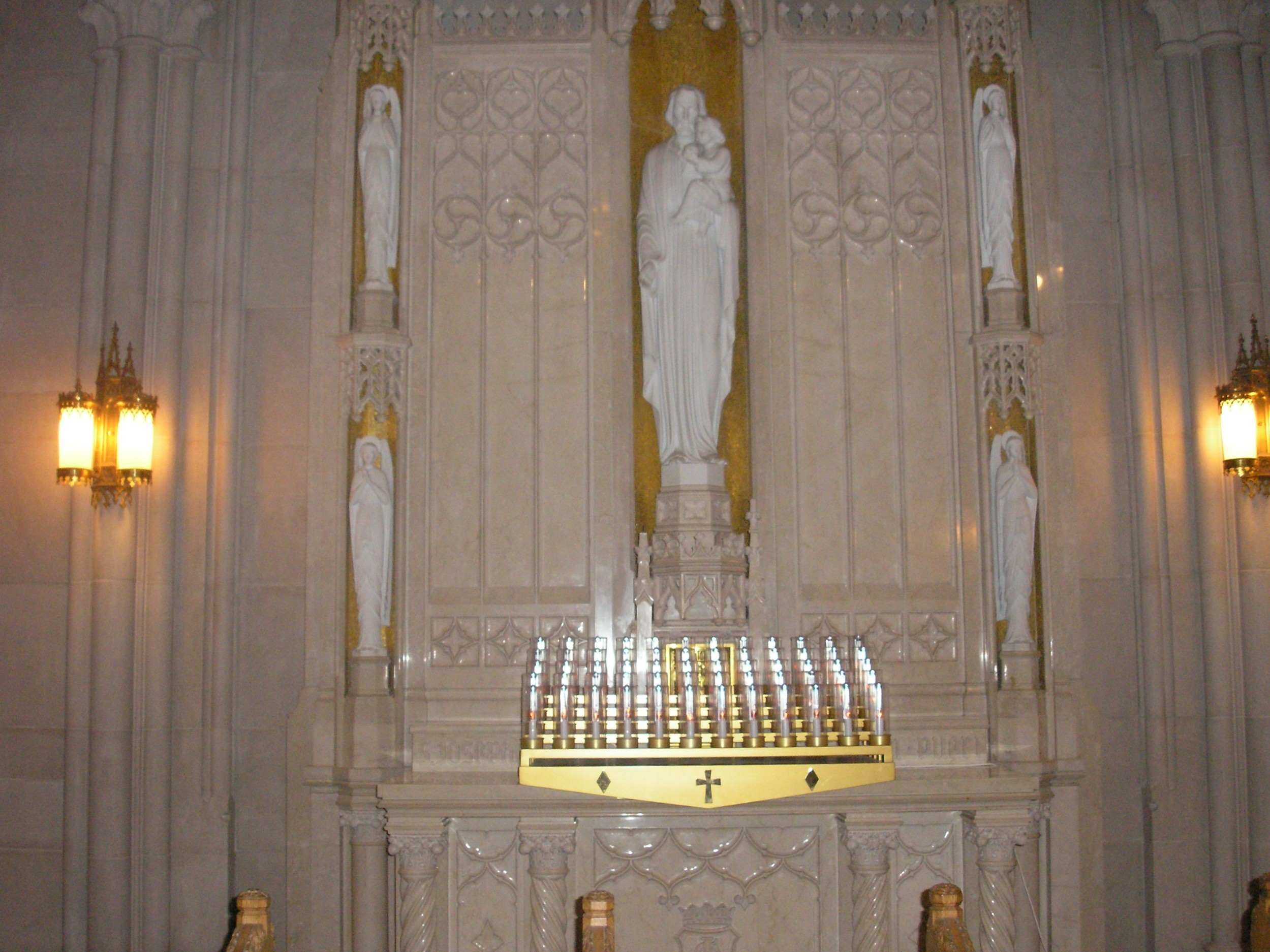
St. Joseph's Chapel in Sacred Heart Cathedral

The cathedral basilica encloses a variety of chapels honoring saints such as Saint Joseph, and representing different ethnic Catholic groups who live in the Newark area and helped build the cathedral.

The structure is named for the Catholic devotion to what is known as the Sacred Heart of Jesus, considered by believers to be a symbolic reference to Jesus Christ's love and compassion for humanity.

== Ambulatory chapels ==
The cathedral contains six chapels arranged around the ambulatory, which is the curved walkway that runs behind the main altar. Five of these are dedicated to saints reflecting the ethnic and racial diversity of the Roman Catholic community in the Archdiocese of Newark at the time of the cathedral's completion.

- The Chapel of Saint Patrick represents the Catholic communities of the British Isles.
- The Chapel of Saint Lucy Filippini represents the Italian and Portuguese communities.
- The Chapel of Saint Boniface represents the German community.
- The Chapel of Saint Stanislaus of Kraków represents the Polish, Slovak and Hungarian communities.
- The Chapel of Saint Anne represents the Hispanic, African and Asian communities. Confession is held in this chapel.

At the center of the ambulatory, between the St. Lucy Filippini and St. Boniface chapels, sits the Lady Chapel, dedicated to the Virgin Mary and considered the crown jewel of the cathedral. The Lady Chapel has an altar of Carrera marble.

The cathedral also contains a secluded chapel and crypt housing the remains of five former bishops and archbishops of Newark, as well as numerous religious relics. This space is not generally open to the public and is reserved for select events.

== Music, religious customs and traditions ==
=== Music at the Cathedral Basilica ===
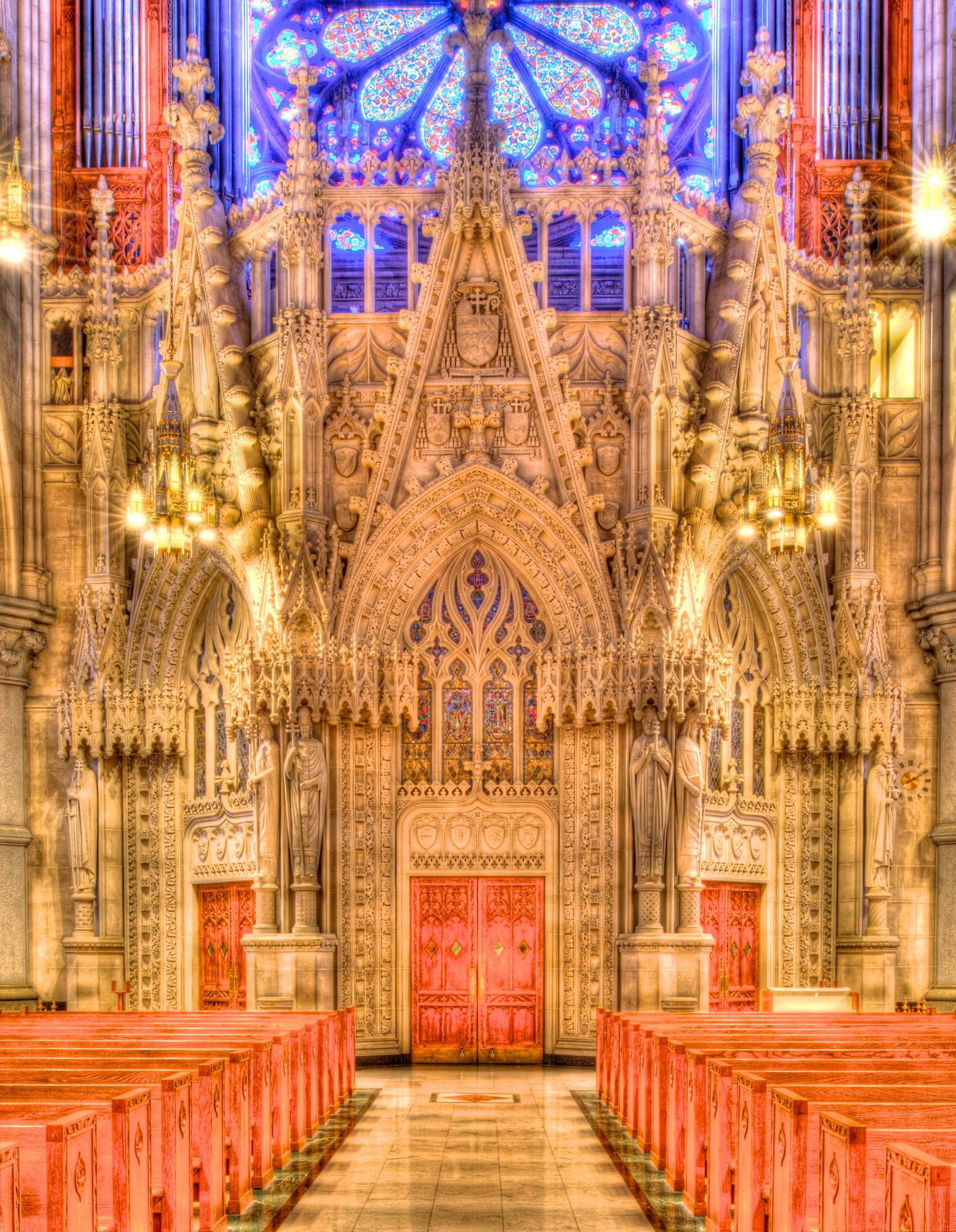
Carved limestone screen in rear of the nave.

The free concert series at the cathedral basilica, open to the public, is in its 55th season as of 2023–24.

The pipe organ, the largest Schantz ever built, includes 154 stops playable from two consoles. When installed in 1953, the organ held 144 stops; it was expanded and renovated in 1989.

Performances of religious music at the cathedral basilica also include the New Jersey Symphony's annual Advent season performance of Handel's Messiah (a ticketed event).

=== Holy Week ===
The cathedral basilica is home to a number of special religious events during Holy Week, including a Palm Sunday mass, Chrism Mass, and services on Holy Thursday, Good Friday and Easter Vigil in anticipation of Easter Sunday.

=== Black History Month Mass ===
The cathedral typically celebrates Black history with an annual mass in which the cathedral basilica is decorated with images of Black Catholic candidates for sainthood and participants frequently wear African, African-American and Caribbean cultural attire.

=== Hispanic Heritage Mass ===
The church celebrates Hispanic heritage with an annual mass, featuring Spanish-language music, and participants often wear cultural dress to represent their nations of origin.

=== Golden Anniversary Mass ===
Each spring, frequently during the cherry blossom season at Branch Brook Park across from the cathedral basilica, Cardinal Tobin holds a mass to honor and bless local couples celebrating 50 years of marriage.

=== Blue Mass ===
The cathedral basilica hosts the Blue Mass annually to honor the dedication and sacrifices of fallen, active, and retired New Jersey law enforcement personnel. Numerous dignitaries typically attend, including Governor Phil Murphy, Attorney General Matthew J. Platkin and others.

=== Red Mass ===
A red mass is held annually for members of the legal profession and government officials.

== Visit by Pope John Paul II and cathedral's elevation to basilica ==
The coat of arms of the cathedral basilica, which includes elements from the archdiocesan arms of Newark, the arms of Pope John Paul II, and an image of the Sacred Heart of Jesus. The motto, Venite ad me ("Come to me"), is taken from Matthew 11:28.

During Pope John Paul II's visit to the United States in 1995, he celebrated evening prayer at the cathedral. At this occasion, the Cathedral of the Sacred Heart was elevated to a minor basilica to become the Cathedral Basilica of the Sacred Heart. This was said to be at the suggestion of Theodore McCarrick.

== Twenty-first century events ==
In 2017, Cardinal Tobin welcomed a pilgrimage of LGBTQ Catholics to the cathedral basilica.

== Additional history ==
=== Planning for the church ===
The Cathedral of the Sacred Heart was proposed in 1859 by James Roosevelt Bayley, the Bishop of Newark, just six years after his appointment by Pope Pius IX. In 1870, Bishop Bailey sent architect Jeremiah O'Rourke and Monsignor George Hobart Doane to Europe to view various cathedrals.

Proposed sites included a corner at High and Kinney Streets and an alternate at South and Broad Streets. However, the current site, next to Branch Brook Park in the Forest Hill section of Newark's North Ward, was chosen. Bayley waited to buy the land until the site was recommended by O'Rourke, the architect of the planned cathedral; and Monsignor Doane. Doane liked the current site because it "commands a view of the Orange Mountains on the west and the Newark Valley, the hills of Staten Island, and New York on the east." The property purchase was completed January 2, 1871, for US$60,000.

In 1872, Bayley was elevated to Archbishop of Baltimore and the project was handed over to the new bishop, Michael Corrigan. Corrigan ordered the excavation of the site in 1875 and 1876. In 1881, the project was handed over to yet another new bishop, Winand Wigger.

The City of Newark wanted to buy the site for the new Newark High School in 1896 but was rejected by Wigger. As the plans moved on, Wigger erected a temporary church under the same name on February 15, 1889. In July 1897, a fundraiser was started to build the cathedral. O'Rourke was chosen to design an English-Irish gothic design. In accepting the commission, O'Rourke pledged to Wigger that the work would be "a labor of love and not of fees and profits."

=== Construction ===
==== Early stages ====
Following groundbreaking in January 1898, the cornerstone was laid on June 11, 1899. O'Rourke wanted to get the walls and towers built first and selected a Vermont Rockport granite as the exterior stone. By 1902, the walls then stood 50 feet at the nave and ambulatory, with the first four tiers of the front towers under construction. Wigger died on January 5, 1901, and the new bishop, John Joseph O'Connor, asked O'Rourke to cut costs not to exceed a price tag of US$1 million.

==== Halt in construction ====
O'Rourke was removed as head architect in 1910 following a series of feuds between O'Rourke and another architect. The new architect, Mr. Waldron noticed a dangerous shift in weight and hired Fred Metcalf to observe this shift. An order went out to remove all 24 pillars, excavate underneath, re-level the ground and reset 22 pillars. The decision to eliminate two pillars allowed the builders to eliminate the clerestory wall connecting the nave and the chancel, widening the transept to 165 feet (50 m). As the arches and clerestory began to rise in the latter half of 1910, architects provided extra reinforcement in the form of steel girders at the clerestory level down either side of the nave and around the ambulatory.

==== Design changes ====
The original English/Irish-gothic style was switched to a French-gothic one with those plans accepted in June 1913 and work starting in August 1913. Changes included:

- reducing the height of the towers from 332 feet (101 m) to 232 feet (71 m);
- eliminating the spires to reduce the weight loads on the tower;
- eliminating the exterior nave buttresses and pinnacles,;
- substituting three rose windows instead of a concentric-circle design; and
- increasing use of sculptures at the entrances.

==== The last stage ====
By 1918, construction moved at a steady pace to allow the completion of the steel-slated roof in November 1919; by the roofing company Conrad & Baier. The granite tympanum canopies and medallions were finished and, by July 1924, the windows were completed. With this, the building was finally insulated for the first time since the construction's start. The carving of the medallions' scriptural scenes and bishops' portraits took place on-site between April 1922 and November 1924 under the direction of Rochette and Parzini of New York City.

In 1925, officials wanted the cathedral completed by December 1926, to coincide with the 50th anniversary of O'Connor's ordination as a priest. The dedication was postponed because of a dispute over the type of limestone used and the many delays in construction. Limestone installation, vaulting, the work on the sanctuary floor and sacristies continued.

With O'Connor's death in May 1927, construction focus shifted to the crypt where he would be laid to rest.

General work re-commenced in August 1927 and ended some months later with the installation of an Italian Botticino-marble altar purchased from Benziger Brothers of New York City. The stained-glass windows were crafted by Franz Mayer of Munich, Germany.

==== Pre-dedication ====
The new bishop, Thomas Joseph Walsh, opened the cathedral even though construction was ongoing. Walsh believed it was time for the cathedral to be open even though it was unfinished.

The first ordination was his own as Bishop of Newark on May 1, 1928. A Pontifical Mass followed, celebrated by Father Joseph H. Conroy, with a crowd of nearly 4,000 people.

Upon the elevation of the Diocese of Newark to the rank of archdiocese by Pope Pius XI, Walsh was appointed its first archbishop on December 10, 1937. He celebrated his Silver Jubilee on July 29, 1943, and the 50th anniversary of his ordination as a priest on May 1, 1950.

During the pre-dedication service, Walsh ordained six bishops in the cathedral.

=== Opening and 20th century events (before 1995 elevation to basilica) ===
==== Dedication ====
After nearly 95 years of planning and building, Thomas Aloysius Boland, Archbishop of Newark, finally dedicated the Cathedral of the Sacred Heart on October 19, 1954. During the ceremony, Boland received the pallium from then-Archbishop Amleto Giovanni Cicognani, Apostolic Nuncio (delegate) to the United States.

==== Post-dedication ====
The Father Monsignor Joseph A. Doyle, who spent his entire priestly life in the cathedral parish, was appointed first rector.

In addition to the six bishops he ordained during the pre-dedication, Boland ordained many priests in this cathedral and showed people's contributions in this church.

Thousands came to celebrate his Golden Jubilee in 1972. In 1974, Pope Paul VI named as Boland's successor Peter Leo Gerety from Portland, Maine.

== Gallery ==
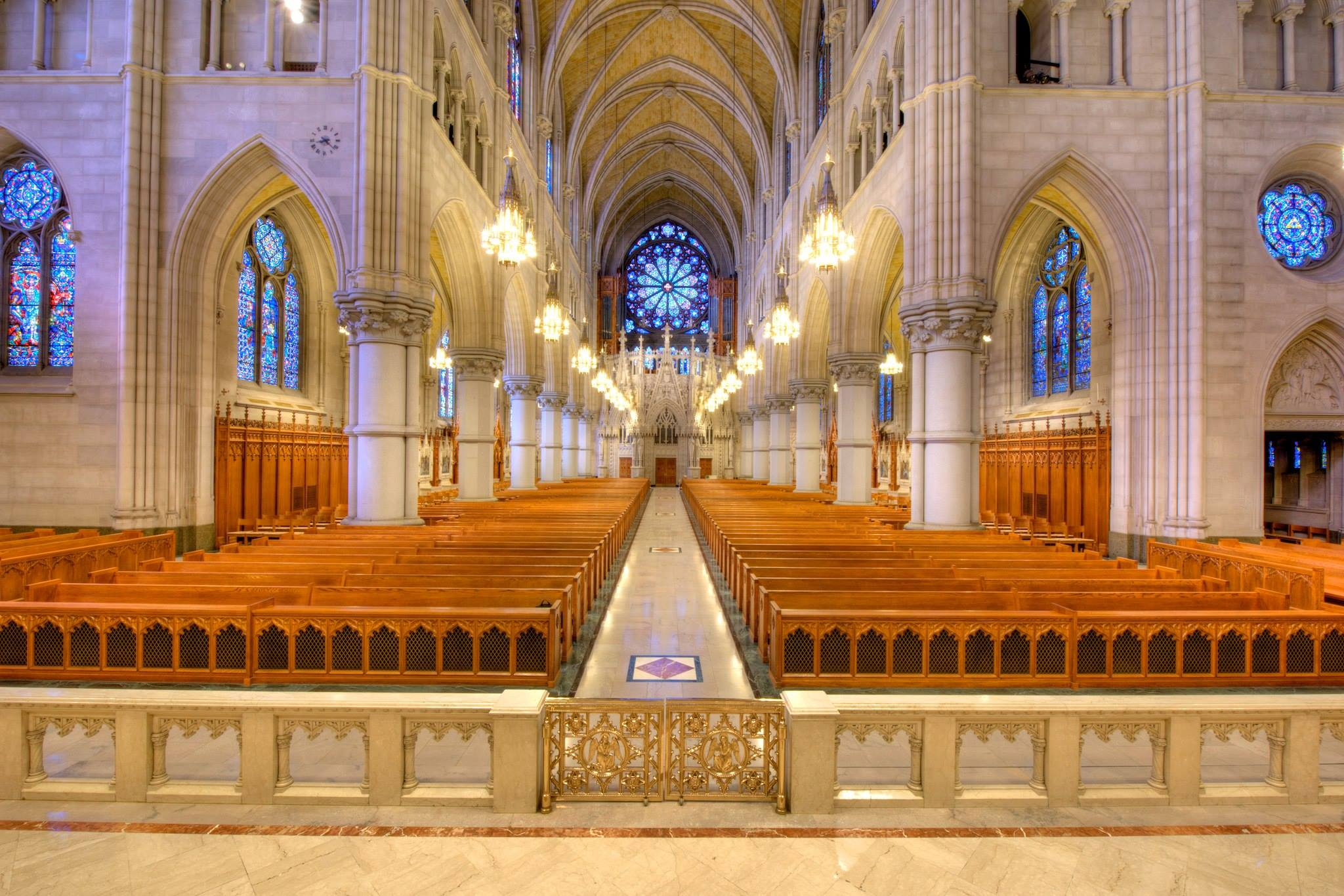
Inside view of the Cathedral Basilica of the Sacred Heart

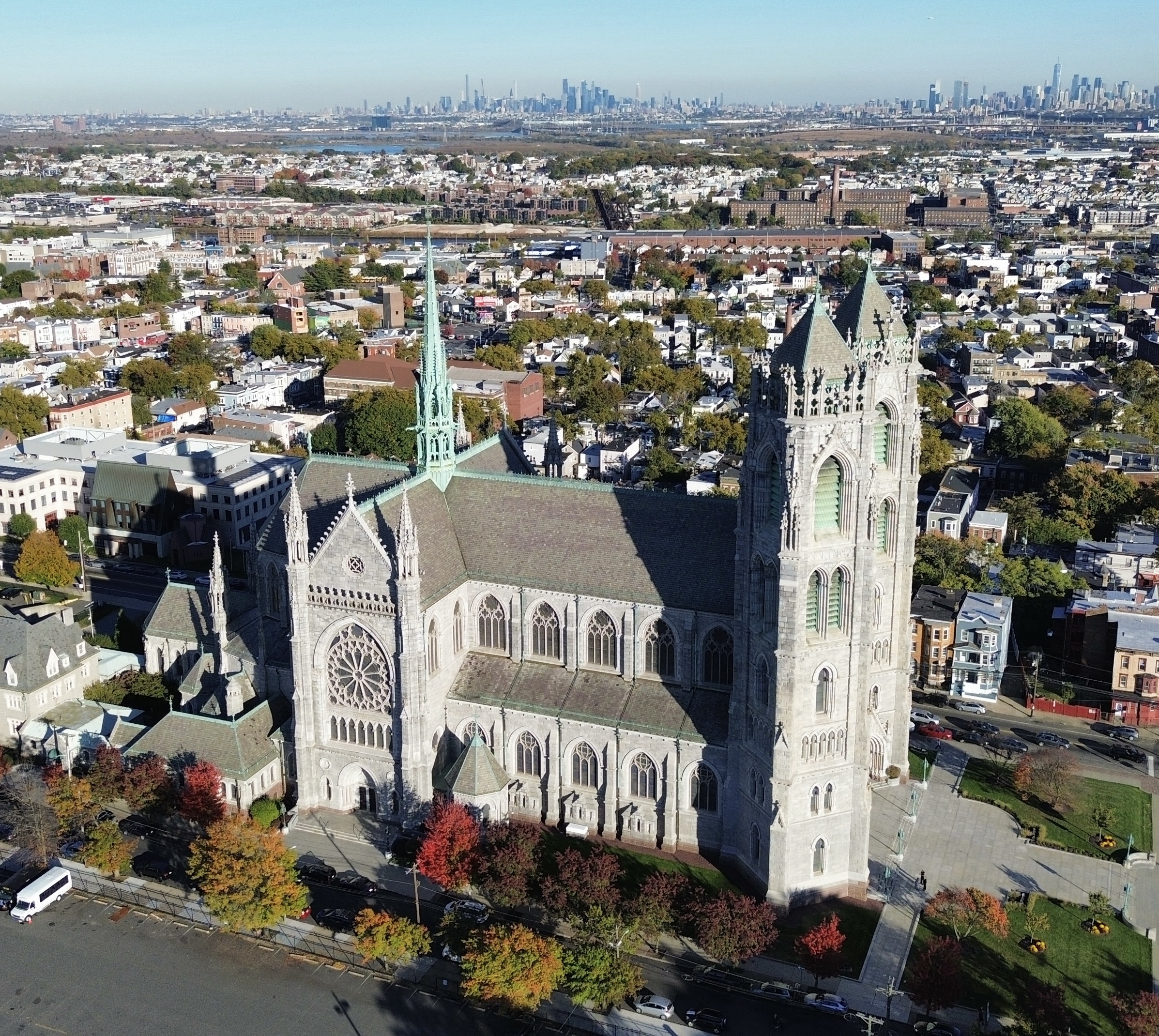
Cathedral Basilica of the Sacred Heart aerial view looking east with New York City in the background

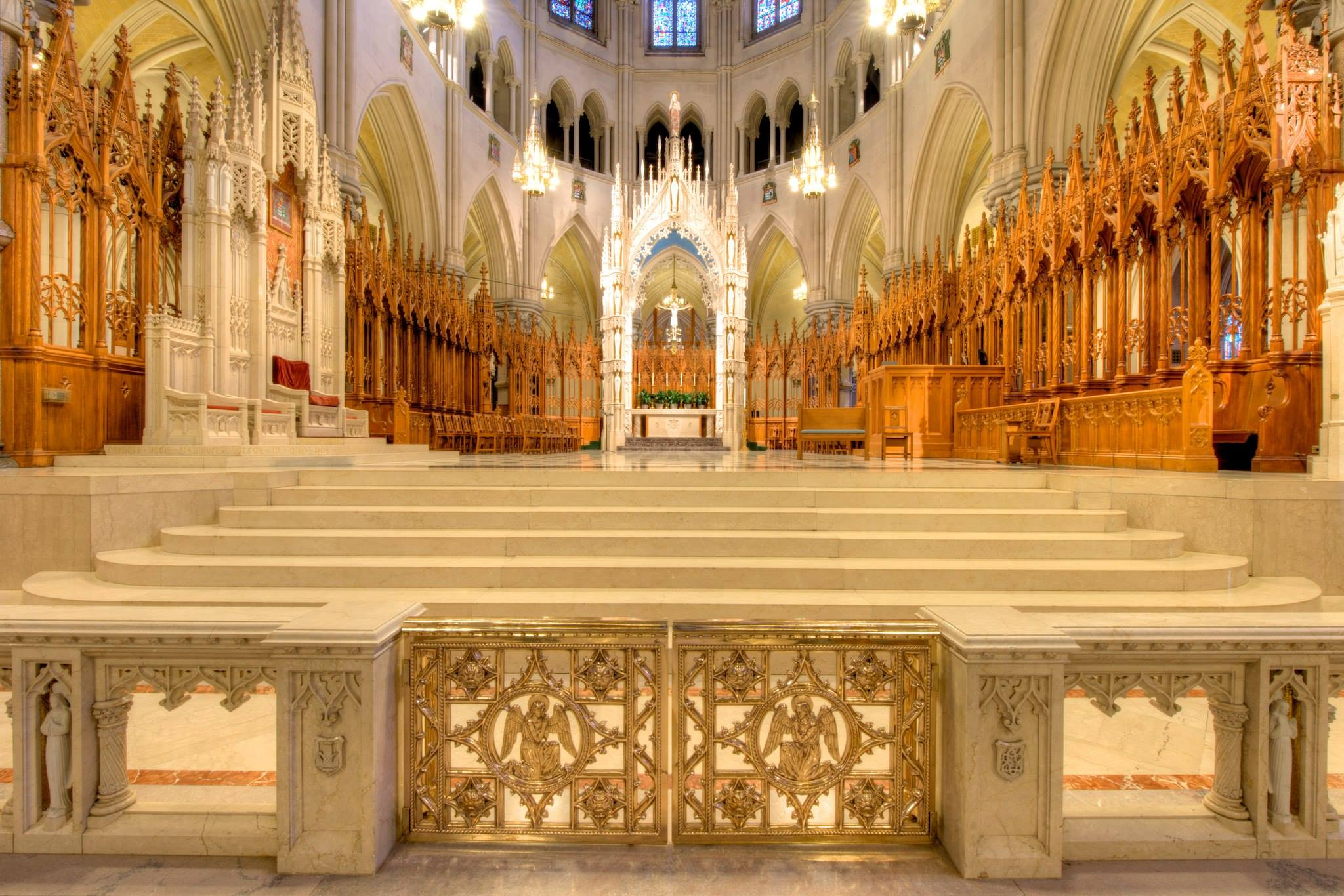
A detail of the sanctuary

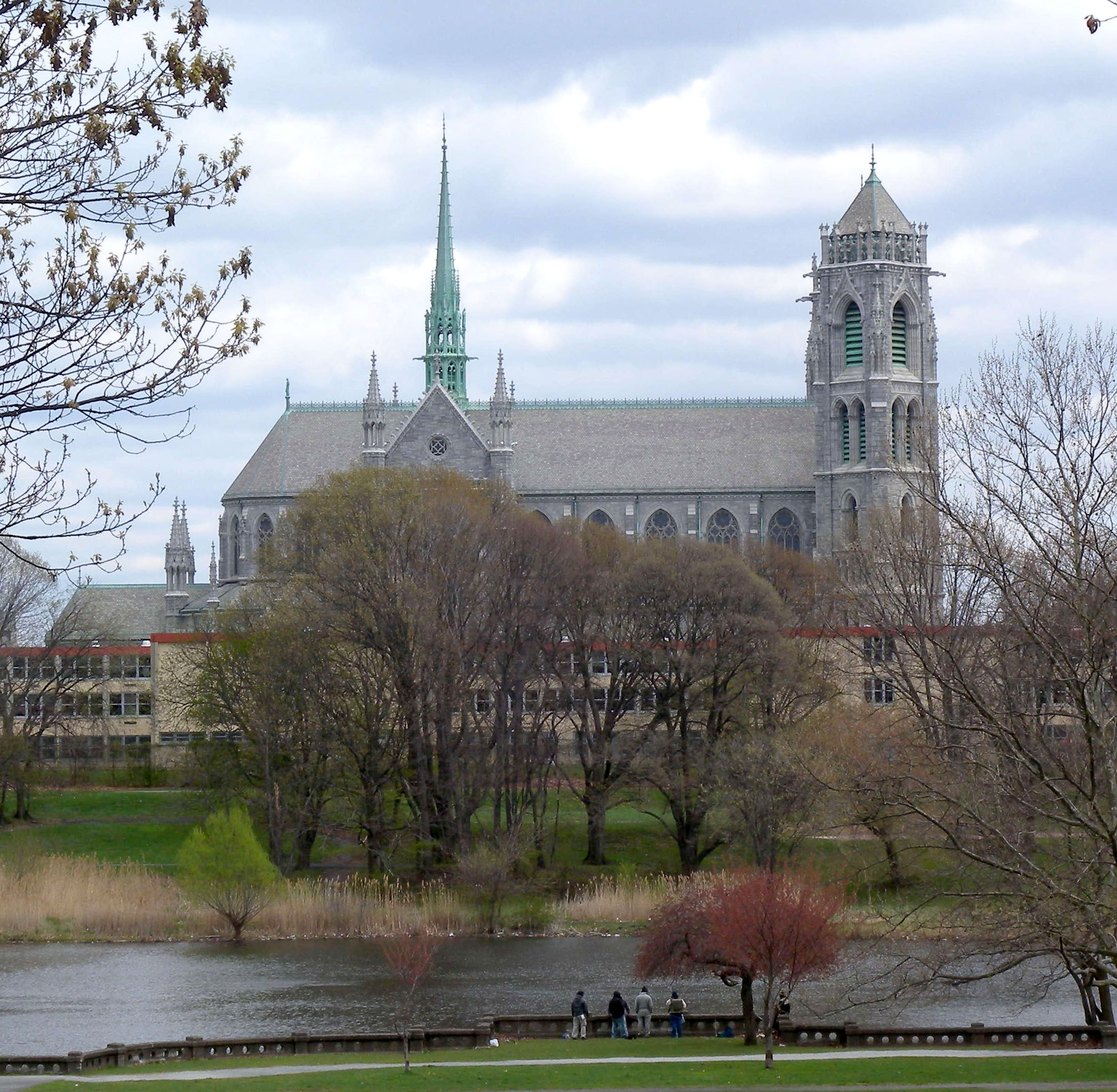
The west façade

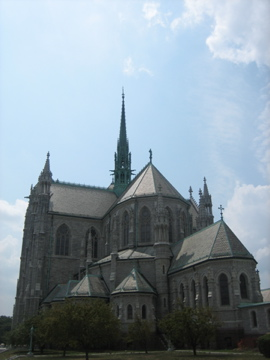
View of the cathedral from the north

== See also ==
- List of Catholic cathedrals in the United States
- List of cathedrals in the United States
- List of largest church buildings
- National Register of Historic Places listings in Essex County, New Jersey
