= List of churches in the Diocese of Trenton =

This is a list of current and former Roman Catholic churches in the Roman Catholic Diocese of Trenton. The diocese encompasses Burlington, Mercer, Monmouth, and Ocean counties in central New Jersey.

== Trenton ==
Name	Image	Location	Description/Notes
Cathedral of St. Mary of the Assumption, Trenton		151 N Warren St, Trenton	
Divine Mercy		215 Adeline St, Trenton	
Our Lady of the Angels		540 Chestnut Ave, Trenton	
Sacred Heart Church, Trenton		Trenton	
St. Anthony		626 S Olden Ave, Trenton	
St. Basil Romanian		238 Adeline St, Trenton	
St. Hedwig		872 Brunswick Ave, Trenton	
St. James		11 E Paul Ave, Trenton	
St. Joachim		20 Butler St, Trenton	
St. Josaphat		1195 Deutz Ave, Trenton	
St. Joseph		540 N Olden Ave, Trenton	
St. Mary Byzantine		411 Adeline St, Trenton	
St. Michael		1130 Brunswick Ave, Trenton	

== Other areas ==
Name	Image	Location	Description/Notes
Holy Spirit		705 2nd Ave, Asbury Park	
Our Lady of Mount Carmel		1201 Asbury Ave, Asbury Park	
St. Agnes		Atlantic Highlands	
Co-Cathedral of St. Robert Bellarmine		Freehold	
St. Denis		Mansaquan	
St. Mary of the Lakes		Medford Lakes	No longer a Catholic church
Our Lady of Good Counsel		Moorestown	
St. Paul		Princeton	
