= John McMahon =

John McMahon may refer to:

- Sir John McMahon, 1st Baronet (1754–1817), British politician
- John A. McMahon (1833–1923), American politician
- John McMahon (wrestler) (1841–1912), collar-and-elbow wrestler
- John E. McMahon (1860–1920), U.S. Army general
- John J. McMahon (architect) (1875–1958), American architect
- John J. McMahon (bishop) (1875–1932), American prelate of the Roman Catholic Church
- Johnny McMahon (English footballer) (1881-1933), footballer for Manchester City, 1902–06
- John McMahon (Australian footballer, born 1900) (1900–1962), Australian footballer for Melbourne
- Johnny McMahon, Irish soccer player
- John McMahon (Australian politician) (1914–1975), member of the New South Wales Legislative Assembly
- John McMahon (Surrey and Somerset cricketer) (1917–2001), Australian-born slow left-arm bowler for Surrey and Somerset
- Jack McMahon (1928–1989), basketball player
- John N. McMahon (born 1929), former Deputy Director of Central Intelligence and as Deputy Director for Operations for the CIA
- John McMahon (Queensland cricketer) (1932–2024), Australian cricketer
- John McMahon (Australian footballer, born 1935) (1935–2002), Australian footballer for Geelong
- John McMahon (footballer, born 1949), English football player for Preston and others
- John McMahon (hurler) (born 1950), Irish retired hurler
- John McMahon (footballer, born 1965), English football player for Darlington
- John McMahon (footballer, born 1964), English football player and coach, manager of Tranmere, Shrewsbury Town and Liverpool reserves
