= John C. Reiss =

Roman Catholic bishop

His Excellency, The Most Reverend John Charles Reiss
- Bishop of Trenton; Titular Bishop of Simidicca
- Church: Roman Catholic Church
- See: Diocese of Trenton
- In office: April 22, 1980 – July 1, 1997
- Predecessor: George W. Ahr
- Successor: John Mortimer Smith
- Previous post: Auxiliary Bishop of Trenton (1967–1980)

Orders
- Ordination: May 31, 1947 by William A. Griffin
- Consecration: December 12, 1967 by George W. Ahr

Personal details
- Born: May 13, 1922 Red Bank, New Jersey, U.S.
- Died: March 4, 2012 (aged 89) Lawrenceville, New Jersey, U.S.
- Education: Catholic University of America; Immaculate Conception Seminary
- Motto: In Christo omnia (All things in Christ)

Styles of John C. Reiss
- Reference style: The Most Reverend
- Spoken style: Your Excellency
- Religious style: Monsignor
- Posthumous style: not applicable

John Charles Reiss (May 13, 1922 – March 4, 2012) was an American prelate of the Roman Catholic Church. He served as bishop of the Diocese of Trenton in New Jersey from 1980 to 1997. He previously served as an auxiliary bishop of the same diocese from 1967 to 1980.

== Biography ==
=== Early life ===
John Reiss was born on May 12, 1922, in Red Bank, New Jersey. He studied for the priesthood at the Catholic University of America in Washington, D.C., and at Immaculate Conception Seminary in Darlington, New Jersey.

=== Priesthood ===
Reiss was ordained to the priesthood for the Diocese of Trenton at St. Mary Cathedral in Trenton by Bishop William A. Griffin on May 31, 1947. After serving as an associate pastor, he became master of ceremonies and secretary to Bishop George W. Ahr in 1953.

In 1954, Reiss earned a doctorate in canon law from the Catholic University School of Canon Law for his thesis entitled The Time and Place of Sacred Ordination: A Historical Synopsis and a Commentary. It was later published by the Catholic University of America Press. Following his return to Trenton, Reiss served as assistant chancellor, vice chancellor, and official of the Diocesan Tribunal. The Vatican named Reiss as a domestic prelate in October 1963. He was appointed pastor of St. Francis Parish in Trenton in 1965.

=== Auxiliary Bishop and Bishop of Trenton ===
On October 21, 1967, Reiss was appointed auxiliary bishop of Trenton and titular bishop of Simidicca by Pope Paul VI. He received his episcopal consecration at St. Mary Cathedral on December 12, 1967, from Ahr, with Bishops Walter W. Curtis and James J. Hogan serving as co-consecrators.

Reiss was named the eighth bishop of Trenton by Pope John Paul II on March 11, 1980, and was installed on April 22, 1980. He was the first native of the diocese to become its ordinary. Reiss presided at the centennial of the diocese in August 1981. In November 1981, the Vatican established the Diocese of Metuchen, taking several counties from the Diocese of Trenton.

During his tenure as bishop, Reiss established the Emmaus program of priestly spirituality in 1982, implemented Renew, a process of lay spiritual renewal, between 1985 and 1987 and held the Fourth Diocesan Synod (the first in 60 years). Reiss in the early 1990s raised $38 million between 1992 and 1995 to provide financial stability for diocesan services through Faith-In-Service, a diocesan capital and endowment fund campaign. In 1994, he dedicated a new Morris Hall facility in Trenton, which included the St. Joseph Hall Skilled Nursing Center and the St. Mary Hall Residence. In 1995, he dedicated Villa Vianney, a residence for retired priests in Lawrenceville, New Jersey, in 1995. Reiss completed a new diocesan pastoral center, tripling the size of the diocesan office building, in 1997.

=== Retirement and death ===
On June 30, 1997, John Paul II accepted Reiss' resignation as bishop of Trenton. He was succeeded by John Mortimer Smith. John Reiss died on March 4, 2012, at age 89 at Villa Vianney.

Catholic Church titles
Preceded by George W. Ahr	Bishop of Trenton; 1980–1997	Succeeded by John Mortimer Smith
