= John J. McMahon =

John J. McMahon may refer to:

- John J. McMahon (bishop) (1875–1932), American prelate of the Roman Catholic Church
- John J. McMahon (architect) (1875–1958), American architect

== See also ==
- John McMahon (disambiguation)
