= William A. Griffin (Roman Catholic bishop) =

American prelate

His Excellency, The Most Reverend William Aloysius Griffin
- Bishop of Trenton titular bishop of Sanavo
- Church: Roman Catholic Church
- See: Diocese of Trenton
- Predecessor: Moses E. Kiley
- Successor: George W. Ahr
- Other posts: Auxiliary Bishop of the Archdiocese of Newark; 1938 to 1940

Orders
- Ordination: August 15, 1910
- Consecration: May 1, 1938 by Thomas J. Walsh

Personal details
- Born: November 20, 1885 Elizabeth, New Jersey, US
- Died: January 1, 1950 (aged 64) Elizabeth
- Education: Seton Hall College; Immaculate Conception Seminary
- Motto: Monstra te esse matrem (Show yourself to be our mother)

William Aloysius Griffin (November 20, 1885 – January 1, 1950) was an American prelate of the Roman Catholic Church. He served as bishop of the Diocese of Trenton in New Jersey from 1940 until his death in 1950. He previously served as an auxiliary bishop of the Archdiocese of Newark in New Jersey from 1938 to 1940.

== Biography ==
=== Early life ===
William Griffin was born on November 20, 1885, in Elizabeth, New Jersey, the eleventh of twelve children of John J. and Catherine (née Lyons) Griffin. One of his brothers, John J. Griffin, became city attorney of Elizabeth and a Democratic Party member of the New Jersey General Assembly. William Griffin received his early education at the parochial school of St. Patrick Parish in Elizabeth, and then attended St. Patrick High School, also in Elizabeth. Griffin then attended Seton Hall College in South Orange, New Jersey before studying for the priesthood at Immaculate Conception Seminary at Seton Hall.

=== Priesthood ===
Griffin was ordained a priest for the Diocese of Newark on August 15, 1910. His first assignment was as principal of Bayley Hall, a grammar school attached to Seton Hall College. A member of the faculty at Seton Hall for fifteen years, Griffin taught Latin, Greek, and English in the preparatory school before becoming professor of philosophy and English in the college.

In 1924, Griffin was appointed diocesan director of the Society for the Propagation of the Faith. He later became national treasurer of the same organization in 1935. From 1929 to 1938, he was pastor of St. Michael Parish in Jersey City, New Jersey. The Vatican named Griffin as a papal chamberlain in 1930. Griffin also served as administrator of St. John and St. Augustine Parishes in Newark, and state chaplain of the Ancient Order of Hibernians and the Catholic Daughters of the Americas.

=== Auxiliary Bishop of Newark ===
On February 26, 1938, Griffin was appointed as an auxiliary bishop of Newark and titular bishop of Sanavo by Pope Pius XI. He received his episcopal consecration on May 1, 1938, from Archbishop Thomas J. Walsh, with Bishops John A. Duffy and Moses E. Kiley serving as co-consecrators, at Sacred Heart Cathedral in Newark. As an auxiliary bishop, he served as rector of Immaculate Conception Seminary.

=== Bishop of Trenton ===
Following the promotion of Bishop Kiley to Archbishop of Milwaukee, Griffin was named bishop of Trenton on May 21, 1940, by Pope Pius XII. His installation took place at St. Mary's Cathedral in Trenton on July 23, 1940.

William Griffin died from a stroke at his sister's home in Elizabeth on January 1, 1950, six weeks past his 64th birthday.

Catholic Church titles
Preceded by Moses E. Kiley	Bishop of Trenton; 1940–1950	Succeeded by George W. Ahr
Preceded by –	Auxiliary Bishop of Newark; 1938–1940	Succeeded by –
