= Moses E. Kiley =

American Catholic prelate (1876–1953)

His Excellency, The Most Reverend Moses Elias Kiley
- Archbishop of Milwaukee
- See: Archdiocese of Milwaukee
- Installed: January 1, 1940
- Term ended: April 15, 1953
- Predecessor: Samuel Stritch
- Successor: Albert Gregory Meyer
- Other post: Bishop of Trenton (1934–1940)

Orders
- Ordination: June 10, 1911
- Consecration: March 17, 1934

Personal details
- Born: November 13, 1876 Margaree Centre, Nova Scotia, Canada
- Died: April 15, 1953 (aged 76) Milwaukee, Wisconsin, US
- Denomination: Roman Catholic Church
- Education: College of St. Laurent; St. Mary's Seminary; Pontificial University of St. Thomas; Pontifical Urban University
- Motto: That I may be faithful

Moses Elias Kiley (November 13, 1876 – April 15, 1953) was a Canadian-born American Catholic prelate who served as archbishop of Milwaukee in Wisconsin from 1940 to 1953. He previously served as bishop of Trenton in New Jersey (1934–1940).

== Biography ==
=== Early life ===
Moses Kiley was born on November 13, 1876, in Margaree, on Cape Breton Island in Nova Scotia, to John and Margaret (née McGarry) Kiley. He received his early education at a grade school in Baddeck, Nova Scotia. When Kiley was 16, the family immigrated to the United States, moving to Somerville, Massachusetts. He financed his higher education by working as an errand boy at a carriage shop in Somerville established by his older brothers. He also worked as a floorwalker at a department store in Boston and as a trolley motorman.

In 1903, Kiley enrolled at the College of St. Laurent in Montreal, Quebec. After three years in Montreal, he began his studies for the priesthood at St. Mary's Seminary in Baltimore, Maryland, in 1906. The following year, Kiley was sent to Rome, where he resided at the Pontifical North American College. While in Rome, he earned a doctorate in philosophy from the Pontifical University of St. Thomas in 1909, and a doctorate in theology from the Pontifical Urban University in 1911.

=== Priesthood ===
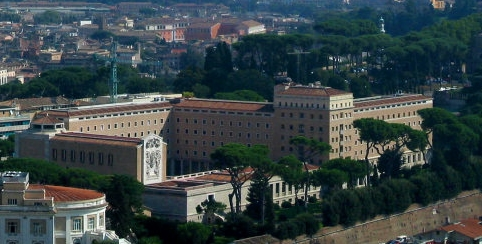
Pontifical North American College, Rome, Italy (2010)

Kiley was ordained a priest for the Archdiocese of Chicago in Rome by Archbishop James Quigley on June 10, 1911.

Following his return to the United States, the archdiocese assigned Kiley as a curate at St. Agnes Parish in Chicago, Illinois, where he remained for five years. In 1916, he established the Mission of the Holy Cross for homeless men. That same year, he was named the first archdiocesan director of Catholic Charities, a post he held until 1926. The Vatican elevated Kiley to the rank of monsignor in 1924.

Kiley returned to Rome in 1926 to serve as spiritual director of the Pontifical North American College.

=== Bishop of Trenton ===
On February 10, 1934, Kiley was appointed the fifth bishop of Trenton by Pope Pius XI. He received his episcopal consecration on March 17, 1934, from Cardinal Raffaele Rossi, with Cardinal Carlo Salotti and Archbishop Thomas Walsh serving as co-consecrators, at the Church of Santa Susanna in Rome. His most notable achievement in Trenton was refinancing $10,000,000 of church obligations.

=== Archbishop of Milwaukee ===
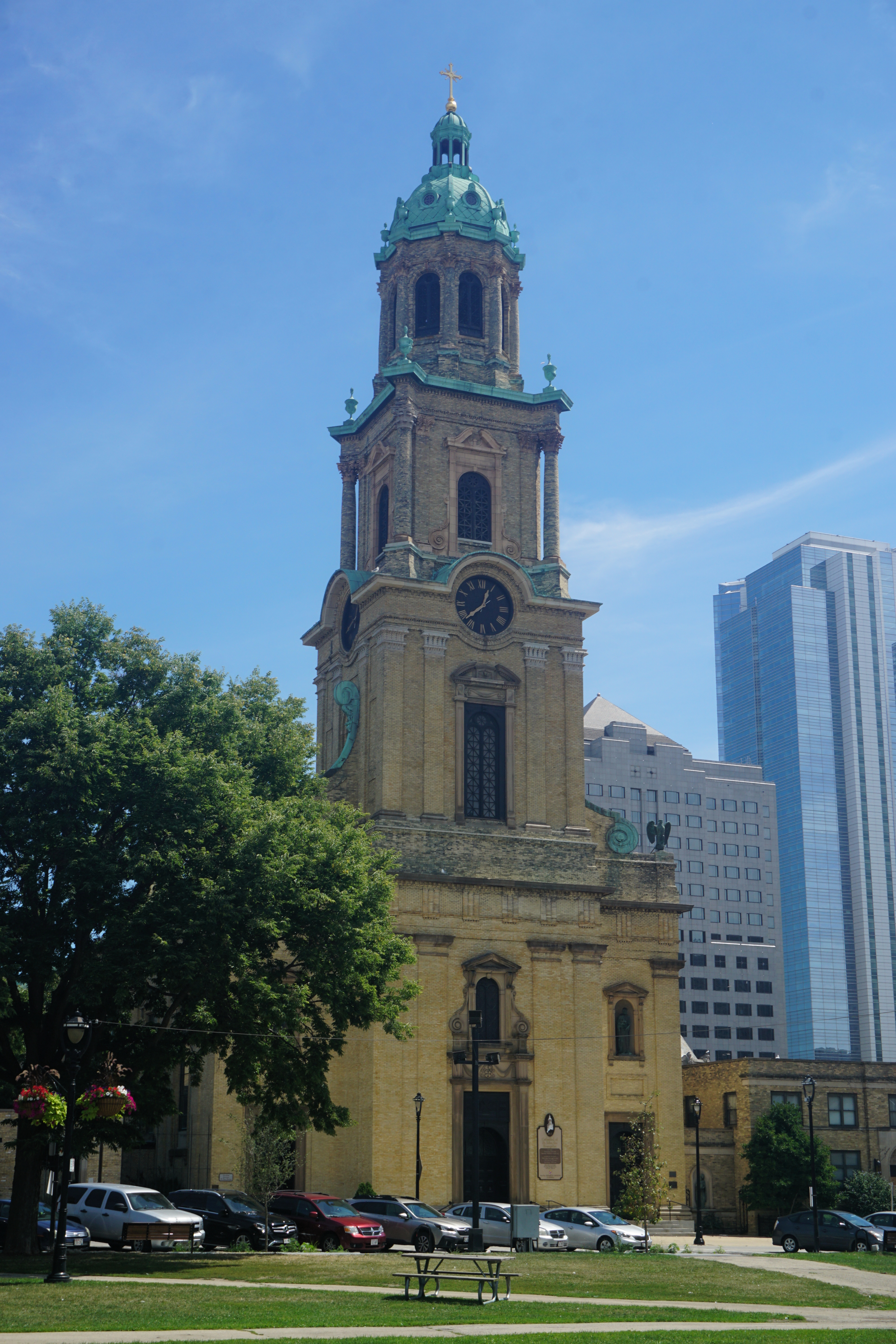
Cathedral of Saint John the Evangelist, Milwaukee, Wisconsin (2022)

Following the transfer of Archbishop Samuel Stritch to the Archdiocese of Chicago, Kiley was appointed the sixth archbishop of Milwaukee by Pope Pius XII on January 1, 1940. Kiley was installed at the Church of the Gesu in Milwaukee on March 28, 1940.

During his tenure in Milwaukee, Kiley earned a reputation as a conservative leader and stern administrator. He oversaw an extensive renovation of the Cathedral of St. John the Evangelist in Milwaukee, which had suffered major fire damage in 1935.

Kiley rebuilt the St. Aemillian Orphanage in Milwaukee, also damaged by fire in the 1930s. Kiley also renovated St. Francis Seminary in St. Francis, Wisconsin, converted Pio Nono High School into a minor seminary, and created a Catholic Family Life Bureau in 1948.

=== Death ===
Moses Kiley died on April 15, 1953, at St. Mary's Hospital in Milwaukee, at age 76.

== See also ==
- Catholic Church hierarchy
- Catholic Church in the United States
- Historical list of the Catholic bishops of the United States
- List of Catholic bishops of the United States
- Lists of patriarchs, archbishops, and bishops

Catholic Church titles
Preceded by Samuel Stritch	Archbishop of Milwaukee; 1940–1953	Succeeded by Albert Gregory Meyer
Preceded by John J. McMahon	Bishop of Trenton; 1934–1940	Succeeded by William A. Griffin
