= John M. Smith (bishop) =

American Roman Catholic prelate (1935–2019)

His Excellency, The Most Reverend John Mortimer Fourette Smith
- Bishop of Trenton; Titular Bishop of Tres Tabernae
- Diocese: Diocese of Trenton
- Appointed: November 21, 1995 (Coadjutor)
- Installed: June 30, 1997
- Term ended: December 1, 2010
- Predecessor: John C. Reiss
- Successor: David M. O'Connell
- Previous posts: Auxiliary Bishop of Newark; 1987 to 1991; Bishop of Pensacola-Tallahassee; 1991 to 1995

Orders
- Ordination: May 27, 1961 by Thomas Boland
- Consecration: January 25, 1988 by Theodore Edgar McCarrick, Peter Leo Gerety, and Walter William Curtis

Personal details
- Born: June 23, 1935 Orange, New Jersey, US
- Died: January 22, 2019 (aged 83) Lawrenceville, New Jersey, US
- Education: John Carroll University; Immaculate Conception Seminary; Catholic University of America
- Motto: Servite Domino in lætitia (I will serve God cheerfully)

Styles of John Mortimer Fourette Smith
- Reference style: His Excellency; The Most Reverend
- Spoken style: Your Excellency
- Religious style: Bishop

John Mortimer Fourette Smith (June 23, 1935 – January 22, 2019) was an American prelate of the Roman Catholic Church. He served as the ninth bishop of the Diocese of Trenton in New Jersey from 1997 to 2010. He previously served as bishop of the Diocese of Pensacola-Tallahassee in Florida from 1991 to 1995 and as an auxiliary bishop of the Archdiocese of Newark in New Jersey from 1987 to 1991

== Biography ==
=== Early life ===
John Smith was born on June 23, 1935, in Orange, New Jersey, to Mortimer and Ethel (née Charnock) Smith. The oldest of three children, he had two brothers, Andrew (who later became a Benedictine monk) and Gregory.

John Smith attended Saint Benedict's Preparatory School in Newark, New Jersey, and John Carroll University in Cleveland, Ohio. In 1955, he entered Immaculate Conception Seminary, located at Seton Hall University in South Orange, New Jersey. He obtained a bachelor's degree in classical languages in 1957.

=== Priesthood ===
Smith was ordained to the priesthood for the Archdiocese of Newark by Archbishop Thomas Boland on May 27, 1961. He then served as assistant chancellor, as defender of the bond of the Metropolitan Tribunal, and director of the Cursillo movement for the archdiocese.

Smith earned a Bachelor of Sacred Theology degree (1961) and a doctorate in canon law (1966) from the Catholic University of America in Washington, D.C. He was also a visiting professor of pastoral theology at the Immaculate Conception Seminary, an elected representative on the archdiocesan Council of Priests, and dean of central Bergen County. Smith was raised to the rank of papal chamberlain by Pope Paul VI in 1971, and assigned to the team ministry of St. Joseph Church in Oradell, New Jersey, in 1973.

In 1982, Smith became a faculty member of the Pontifical North American College in Rome, where he was director of the Institute for Continuing Theological Education and program director of the U.S. Bishops' Consultation IV. Upon his return to New Jersey in 1986, he was named pastor of St. Mary's Parish in Dumont and later vicar general and moderator of the curia.

=== Auxiliary Bishop of Newark ===
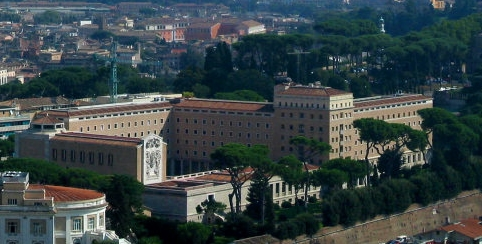
Pontifical North American College, Rome (2010)

On November 20, 1987, Smith was appointed titular bishop of Tres Tabernae and as an auxiliary bishop of Newark by Pope John Paul II. He received his episcopal consecration on January 25, 1988, at the Cathedral of the Sacred Heart in Newark from Archbishop Theodore McCarrick, with Archbishop Peter Gerety and Bishop Walter Curtis serving as co-consecrators. From November 1985 to July 1991, including his time as auxiliary bishop of Newark, Smith lived with McCarrick at the Newark cathedral rectory.

=== Bishop of Pensacola-Tallahassee ===
Smith was named the third bishop of Pensacola-Tallahassee on June 25, 1991, by John Paul II. He was installed on July 31 of that year.

=== Coadjutor Bishop and Bishop of Trenton ===
On November 21, 1995, Smith was appointed coadjutor bishop of Trenton. He succeeded Bishop John C. Reiss as the ninth bishop of Trenton upon the latter's resignation on June 30, 1997.

In 2002, Smith removed a priest accused of molesting a young boy from an administrative position in the diocese. The diocese had reported the allegation to the Monmouth County prosecutor's office when it was first made in 1990, but prosecutors had decided not to file criminal charges because of insufficient evidence. Smith relieved the priest of his duties following a review of personnel files to ensure the public's confidence in the clergy.

=== Retirement and legacy ===
On June 4, 2010, David M. O'Connell was named coadjutor bishop of the diocese, and on December 1, 2010, Pope Benedict XVI accepted Smith's resignation as bishop of Trenton.

John Smith died in Morris Hall Meadows Home in Lawrenceville, New Jersey, on January 22, 2019, following a long illness.

In November 2020, a Vatican investigation into McCarrick, now defrocked, identified Smith as one of three bishops who "provided inaccurate and incomplete information to the Holy See regarding McCarrick’s sexual conduct with young adults" when McCarrick was a candidate for the post of Archbishop of Washington in 2000.

== See also ==
- Catholic Church hierarchy
- Catholic Church in the United States
- Historical list of the Catholic bishops of the United States
- List of Catholic bishops of the United States
- Lists of patriarchs, archbishops, and bishops

Catholic Church titles
Preceded by John C. Reiss	Bishop of Trenton; 1997–2010	Succeeded by David M. O'Connell
Preceded by –	Coadjutor Bishop of Trenton; 1995–1997	Succeeded by –
Preceded by Joseph Keith Symons	Bishop of Pensacola-Tallahassee; 1991–1995	Succeeded by John Ricard, SSJ
Preceded by –	Auxiliary Bishop of Newark; 1988–1991	Succeeded by –
Preceded by Joseph Thomas O’Keefe	Titular Bishop of Tres Tabernae; 1987–1991	Succeeded by Fiachra Ó Ceallaigh, O.F.M.
