= George W. Ahr =

American prelate

His Excellency, The Most Reverend George William Ahr
- Bishop of Trenton
- See: Diocese of Trenton
- In office: March 20, 1950 to June 23, 1979
- Predecessor: William A. Griffin
- Successor: John C. Reiss

Orders
- Ordination: July 29, 1928 by Alfonso Maria de Sanctis
- Consecration: March 20, 1950 by Thomas J. Walsh

Personal details
- Born: June 23, 1904 Newark, New Jersey, US
- Died: May 5, 1993 (aged 88) Lawrenceville, New Jersey, US
- Denomination: Roman Catholic
- Education: St. Vincent College; Seton Hall University; Pontifical North American College
- Motto: Maria spes mia (Mary is my hope)

George William Ahr (June 23, 1904 – May 5, 1993) was an American prelate of the Catholic Church. He served as bishop of the Diocese of Trenton in New Jersey from 1950 to 1979.

== Biography ==
=== Early life ===
George Ahr was born on June 23, 1904, in Newark, New Jersey. He attended St. Ann's Grammar School and St. Benedict's Preparatory School, both in Newark. He then studied at St. Vincent College in Latrobe, Pennsylvania and at Seton Hall University in South Orange, New Jersey.

=== Priesthood ===
After completing his theological studies in Rome at the Pontifical North American College, Ahr was ordained to the priesthood there by Bishop Alfonso Maria de Sanctis for the Archdiocese of Newark on July 29, 1928. He later earned a doctorate in sacred theology in 1929.

Following his return to New Jersey, the archdiocese assigned Ahr as a curate at St. Mary's Parish in Jersey City, New Jersey. He then served at St. Venantius Parish in Orange, New Jersey. In 1930, he was named to the faculty of Seton Hall Preparatory School. Ahr was named professor of dogmatic theology (1933) and later rector (1947) at Immaculate Conception Seminary at Seton Hall

=== Bishop of Trenton ===
On January 28, 1950, Ahr was appointed the seventh bishop of Trenton by Pope Pius XII. He received his episcopal consecration on March 20, 1950, from Archbishop Thomas J. Walsh, with Bishops Bartholomew J. Eustace and Thomas A. Boland serving as co-consecrators. During his tenure, the number of Catholics in the diocese rose from 300,000 to 850,000. Ahr founded 50 parishes and dedicated 100 new churches, 90 schools, and over 60 other buildings. He attended the Second Vatican Council in Rome from 1962 to 1965. Ahr perceived a growing anti-clericalism in the United States, and opposed the Christian Layman's Experimental Organization.

=== Retirement and legacy ===
On June 23, 1979, Pope John Paul II accepted Ahr's resignation as bishop of Trenton; he was the longest-serving bishop of the diocese. George Ahr died at Morris Hall Home of the Aged in Lawrenceville, New Jersey, on May 5, 1993, at age 88.

Catholic Church titles
Preceded by William A. Griffin	Bishop of Trenton; 1950–1979	Succeeded by John C. Reiss
