= Our Lady of Good Counsel Church (Moorestown, New Jersey) =

Coordinates: 39.962740°N 74.948446°W

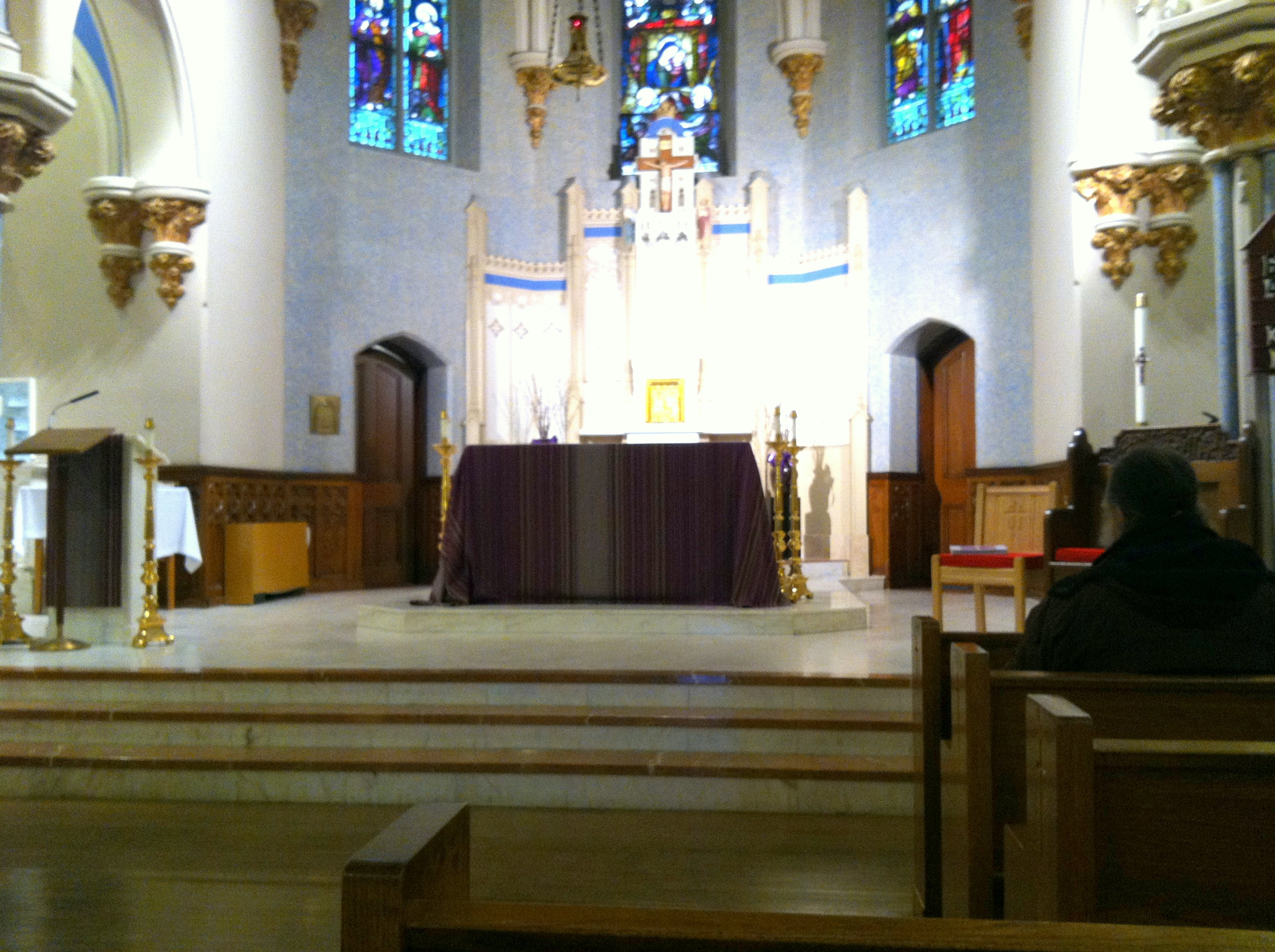
- View of the sanctuary of the main church at the Parish of Our Lady of Good Counsel, Moorestown, New Jersey
- Our Lady of Good Counsel Church
- Location: 42 West Main Street, Moorestown, New Jersey
- Country: United States
- Denomination: Catholic

History
- Founded: 1832
- Dedication: Our Lady of Good Counsel

Architecture
- Style: Mid-Gothic Romanesque Revival
- Completed: July 14, 1895

Administration
- Diocese: Trenton

Our Lady of Good Counsel Roman Catholic Church is a church of the Catholic Diocese of Trenton in the Mid-Gothic Romanesque Revival style and is located at 42 West Main Street in Moorestown Township, New Jersey, United States. While the title "Our Lady of Good Counsel" is generally applied to a painting showing Mary comforting the child Jesus the parish has adopted its name from another event—the wedding feast at Cana at which Mary gave the waiters the "good counsel" recorded in John 2:5 that they should "do whatever he [Jesus] tells you." The current church building is the oldest building in the downtown part of Moorestown, an area which, in 1990, was listed on the National Register of Historic Places. The outside of the church is marked by a 1,150 pound statue of Mary, holding the infant Jesus—placed there to mark the centenary of the church building. It was designed by Carl LaVitch of Pennsauken, New Jersey.

== History ==
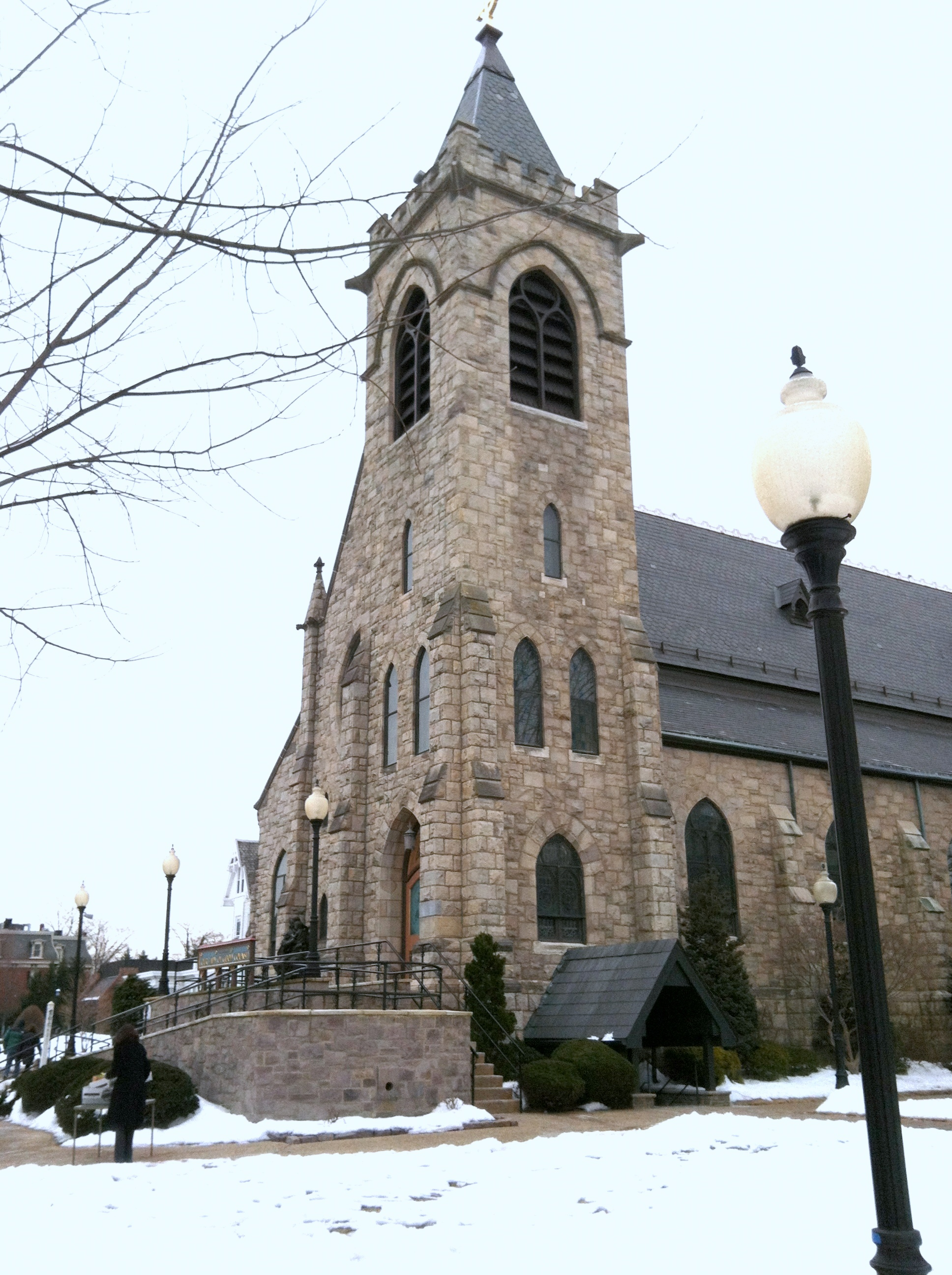
Outside of Our Lady of Good Counsel Church, Moorestown, New Jersey

The parish grew out of a mission on the farm of a Catholic family which had settled in Fellowship, New Jersey in 1832; they established a mission chapel named “The Chapel of Our Lady and St. Patrick” at which Mass would sometimes be celebrated by priests traveling from the parish of Immaculate Conception in Camden, about ten miles to the southwest. At that time, the parish was in the Philadelphia Diocese and, as the Catholic population of the area grew, Bishop John Neumann of the Philadelphia Diocese in 1852 ordered that Mass be celebrated at the chapel monthly.

After a fire destroyed the chapel in 1866, a straw purchase (used because of the antipathy towards Catholics in the town at the time) gained the congregation the land for a new church on the main street of Moorestown and the building, a brick church, opened in 1867. By 1879, the Bishop of Newark Michael Corrigan changed the status of the church from "mission church" to a parish—meaning it would be served by a resident priest.

The current church, built of Stockton stone, was erected after the original structure was damaged in a wind storm in the early 1890s and was completed sixteen months after the cornerstone was laid on July 14, 1895.

== School ==
In 1927, the parish grade school opened with four classrooms for eight grades, staffed by the Sisters of St. Joseph of Chestnut Hill, who remained at the school until 1986. In 1962, the school was expanded, allowing two classes for each grade level. The school won the National Blue Ribbon Award for excellence in 2015.

== Current population and status ==
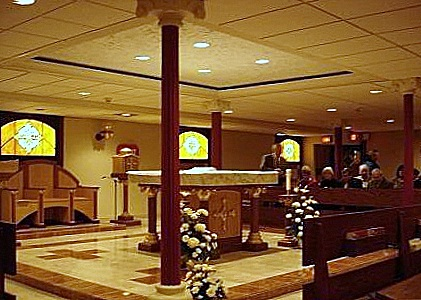
Photo of the Crypt Chapel at Good Counsel Church

As of mid-2013, the parish, which included most of Moorestown and a portion of Mount Laurel, consisted of more than 5,800 Catholic families. Since 2017, the school enrollment was about 420 students from PK3 to Eighth Grade and a Religious Education program provided religious instruction for more than 1,500 Catholic students who attend public schools. School students are not limited to families of parishioners. The school principal is Dr. Carla Chiarelli.

The current administrator is the Reverend Christopher Picollo. The current Mass schedule is (for Sabbath Masses) at 5 p.m. on Saturday and at 8:00, 10:00 a.m. and noon on Sunday, while daily Masses are at 9 a.m. from Monday through Saturday in the Crypt Chapel. In addition there is Confession of sins on Saturday afternoons at 3:30 p.m. in the chapel. The Saturday Vigil and Sunday Masses can be viewed live on the parish website, which also contains an archive of selected past services.

The upper church is accessible to wheelchairs via a ramp at the front entrance on Main Street.
