= David M. O'Connell =

American Catholic bishop

His Excellency, The Most Reverend David M. O'Connell CM
- Bishop of Trenton
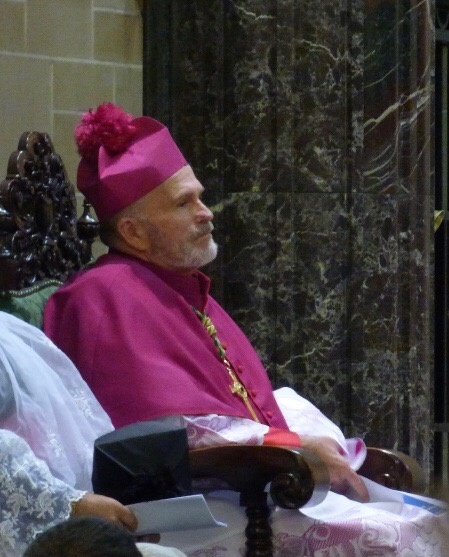
- O'Connell in 2021
- Archdiocese: Newark
- Diocese: Trenton
- Appointed: June 4, 2010
- Installed: December 1, 2010
- Predecessor: John M. Smith
- Previous post: President of The Catholic University of America (1998–2010)

Orders
- Ordination: May 29, 1982 by Joseph Mark McShea
- Consecration: July 30, 2010 by John M. Smith, John J. Myers, and Donald Wuerl

Personal details
- Born: April 21, 1955 (age 71) Philadelphia, Pennsylvania
- Denomination: Roman Catholic Church
- Residence: Trenton, New Jersey, United States
- Parents: Arthur J. and June O'Connell
- Education: Niagara University; Mary Immaculate Seminary; Catholic University of America
- Motto: Ministrare non ministrai (To serve and not to be served)

Styles of David M. O'Connell
- Reference style: His Excellency; The Most Reverend
- Spoken style: Your Excellency
- Religious style: Bishop

David Michael O'Connell CM (born April 21, 1955) is an American Catholic prelate who has served as Bishop of Trenton since 2010. He is a member of the Congregation of the Mission and a past president of the Catholic University of America (CUA).

== Biography ==
=== Early life and education ===
David O'Connell was born on April 21, 1955, in Philadelphia, Pennsylvania, one of the four sons of Arthur J. and June O'Connell. He was raised in nearby Langhorne, Pennsylvania. Feeling drawn at an early age to the Catholic priesthood, he attended St. Joseph Preparatory High School in Princeton, New Jersey.

After graduating from high school, O'Connell entered Niagara University in Lewiston, New York. He received a Bachelor of Arts in philosophy from Niagara in 1978. He continued his studies for the priesthood at Mary Immaculate Seminary in Northampton, Pennsylvania, where he earned a Master of Divinity in 1981 and a Master of Theology in moral theology in 1983.

=== Ordination and ministry ===
O'Connell was ordained a priest of the Vincentians by Joseph McShea on May 29, 1982, in the chapel of the Mary Immaculate Seminary. After his ordination, the Vincentians assigned O'Connell as a teacher at Archbishop Wood Catholic High School in Warminster, Pennsylvania, where he taught religion classes and served as director of student activities.

O'Connell moved to Washington D.C. in 1985 to study at the CUA School of Canon Law. During this period, he also worked as registrar and an assistant professor of canon law, theology, and philosophy at Mary Immaculate Seminary. O'Connell was awarded a Licentiate of Canon Law by CUA in 1987 and a Doctor of Canon Law in 1990. He also served as an ecclesiastical judge and canonical consultant for:

- Diocese of Harrisburg (1987 to 1998)
- Diocese of Birmingham (1987 to 1993)
- Diocese of Scranton (1988 to 1998)

Between 1990 and 1998, O'Connell served at St. John's University in New York City as associate dean, professor of theology and religious studies, academic dean and dean of faculty. O'Connell was named as associate vice president of the university in 1995 and assistant legal counsel in 1996.

=== President of Catholic University of America ===
In 1998, O'Connell was appointed president of CUA. At his inauguration, O'Connell took the controversial Oath of Fidelity, expressing his support for Ex Corde Ecclesiae, issued by Pope John Paul II in 1990. The document was criticized as an attack on academic freedom at Catholic universities.

O'Connell was named a consultor to the Vatican Congregation for Catholic Education in 2005. In 2006, CUA appointed O'Connell as the John Joseph Keane University Professor for that year. On October 2, 2009, O'Connell announced that he was resigning as CUA president in August 2010.

=== Coadjutor Bishop and Bishop of Trenton ===
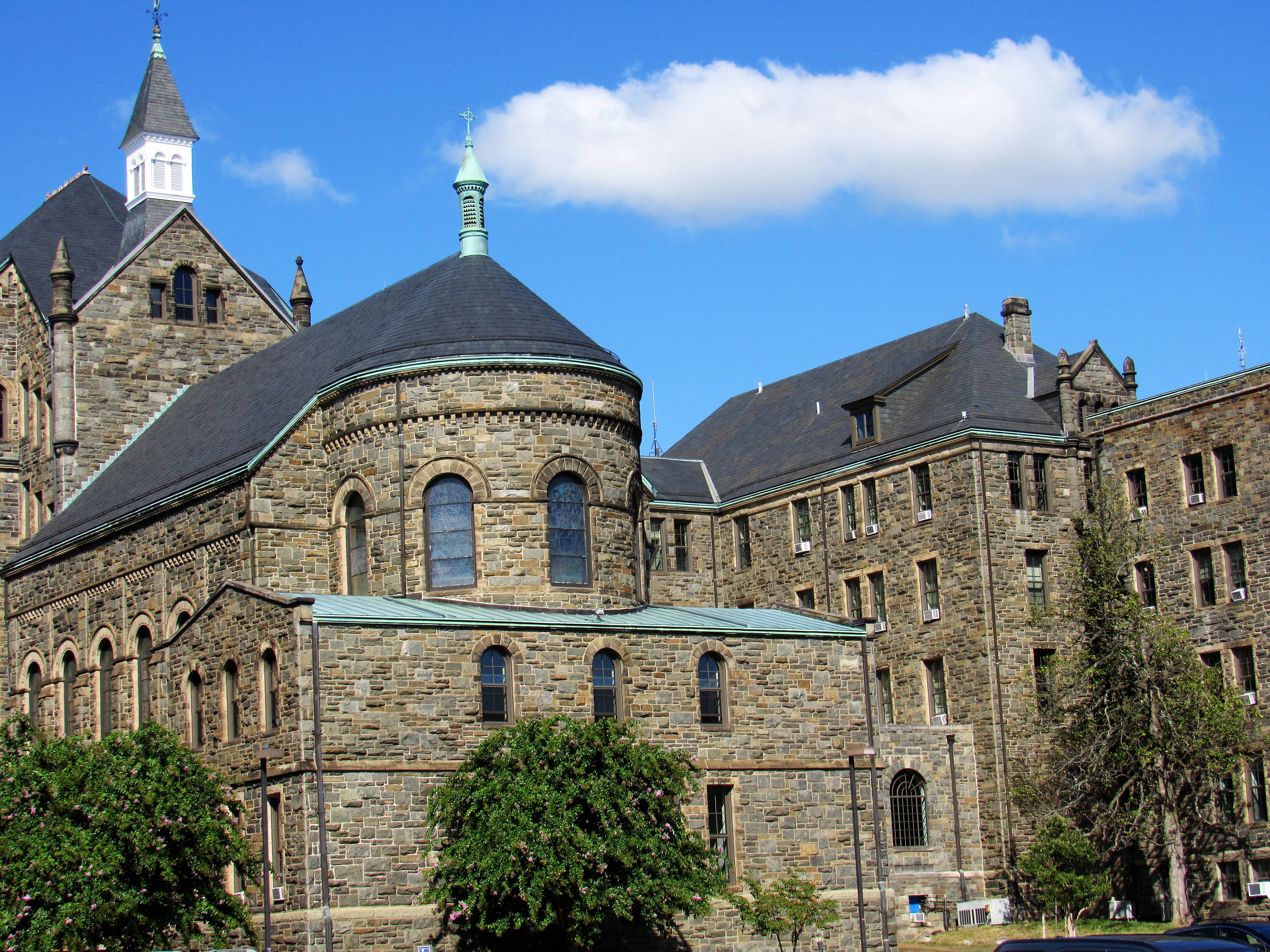
Catholic University of America, Washington, D.C. (2019)

On June 4, 2010, O'Connell was appointed coadjutor bishop of Trenton by Pope Benedict XVI to assist Bishop John M. Smith. O'Connell received his episcopal consecration on July 30, 2010, from Smith, with Archbishops John J. Myers and Donald Wuerl serving as co-consecrators, at the Cathedral of St. Mary of the Assumption in Trenton. O'Connell chose as his episcopal motto: Ministrare non ministrari, meaning, "To serve and not to be served" (Mark 10:45). As coadjutor bishop, O'Connell automatically succeeded Smith on December 1, 2010, when he retired.

In August 2012, O'Connell received records showing that Reverend Matthew Riedlinger had exchanged sexually explicit text messages with a person he believed to be a 16-year-old boy, then tried to set up a meeting with him. O'Connell removed Riedlinger from the parish where he was serving, but did not inform parishioners of the reason for his removal. He only released the information after learning that The Star-Ledger was publishing an article on Riedlinger.

In 2014, the CUA named Father O'Connell Hall in honor of David O'Connell. In December 2014, after O'Connell suffered a severe bone infection, surgeons amputated his left leg. On February 19, 2017, O'Connell and Archbishop Christophe Pierre elevated St. Robert Bellarmine Church in Freehold, New Jersey, to the rank of co-cathedral. It is now known as the Co-Cathedral of St. Robert Bellarmine.

== See also ==
- Catholic Church hierarchy
- Catholic Church in the United States
- Historical list of the Catholic bishops of the United States
- List of Catholic bishops of the United States
- Lists of patriarchs, archbishops, and bishops

Catholic Church titles
Preceded by John M. Smith	Bishop of Trenton; 2010–present	Incumbent
Academic offices
Preceded by Patrick Ellis	President of the Catholic University of America; 1998–2010	Succeeded by John H. Garvey
