= Michael J. O'Farrell =

Irish-born prelate

His Excellency, The Right Reverend Michael Joseph O'Farrell
- Bishop of Trenton
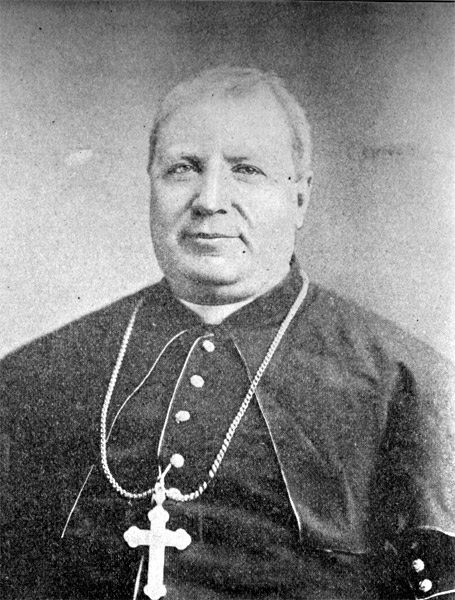
- Church: Roman Catholic Church
- See: Diocese of Trenton
- In office: November 1, 1881 to April 2, 1894
- Successor: James Augustine McFaul

Orders
- Ordination: August 18, 1855 by John Ryan
- Consecration: November 1, 1881 by John McCloskey

Personal details
- Born: December 2, 1832 Limerick, Ireland
- Died: April 2, 1894 (aged 61) Trenton, New Jersey, US
- Education: All Hallows College; Seminary of Saint-Sulpice
- Motto: Sinite parvulos venire ad me (Let the little children come to me)

Michael Joseph O'Farrell (December 2, 1832 – April 2, 1894) was an Irish-born prelate of the Roman Catholic Church who served as the first bishop of the Diocese of Trenton in New Jersey from 1881 until his death.

== Biography ==
=== Early life ===
Michael O'Farrell was born on December 2, 1832, in Limerick, Ireland. He studied the classics and philosophy at All Hallows College in Dublin. He then went to France to study theology at the Seminary of Saint-Sulpice in Paris.

=== Priesthood ===
O'Farrell was ordained into the priesthood by Bishop John Ryan in Limerick on August 18, 1855. He then returned to Paris, where he joined the Society of Saint-Sulpice. After completing his novitiate, he was made professor of dogmatic theology. O'Farrell was sent by his superiors to teach at the Grand Seminary of Montreal in Montreal, Quebec. He also served as pastor of St. Patrick's Basilica Parish in Montreal.

O'Farrell eventually left the Sulpicians and moved to New York City, where he was incardinated, or transferred, into the Diocese of New York. He served as a curate at St. Peter's Parish in Manhattan until 1872, when he became pastor of St. Mary's Parish in Rondout, New York. After a brief tenure at St. Mary's, O'Farrell returned to St. Peter's in 1873 as its pastor.

=== Bishop of Trenton ===
On August 11, 1881, O'Farrell was appointed the first bishop of the newly erected Diocese of Trenton by Pope Leo XIII. He received his episcopal consecration on November 1, 1881, at St. Patrick's Cathedral in Manhattan from Cardinal John McCloskey, with Archbishop Michael Corrigan and Bishop John Loughlin serving as co-consecrators.

O'Farrell designated St. Mary's Church in Trenton as his cathedral. According to historian John Gilmary Shea, O'Farrell's efforts to establish institutions to develop religion in the southern part of New Jersey "...did not fail to excite hostility". St. John's Church, the oldest Catholic church in the diocese, burned down in 1883. During his tenure, O'Farrell erected several new parishes and missions, and established an orphanage in New Brunswick, New Jersey. and a home for the aged in Beverly, New Jersey.

O'Farrell also attended the Third Plenary Council of Baltimore in 1884. At the beginning of his tenure, the diocese contained 51 priests, 60 churches, and 24 parochial schools; by the time of his death, there were 92 priests, 101 churches, and 82 parochial schools.

=== Death ===
Michael O'Farrell died in Trenton on April 2, 1894, at age 61.

Catholic Church titles
Preceded by none	Bishop of Trenton; 1881—1894	Succeeded by James Augustine McFaul
