= Villa Victoria Academy =

Catholic high school in Mercer County, New Jersey, United States

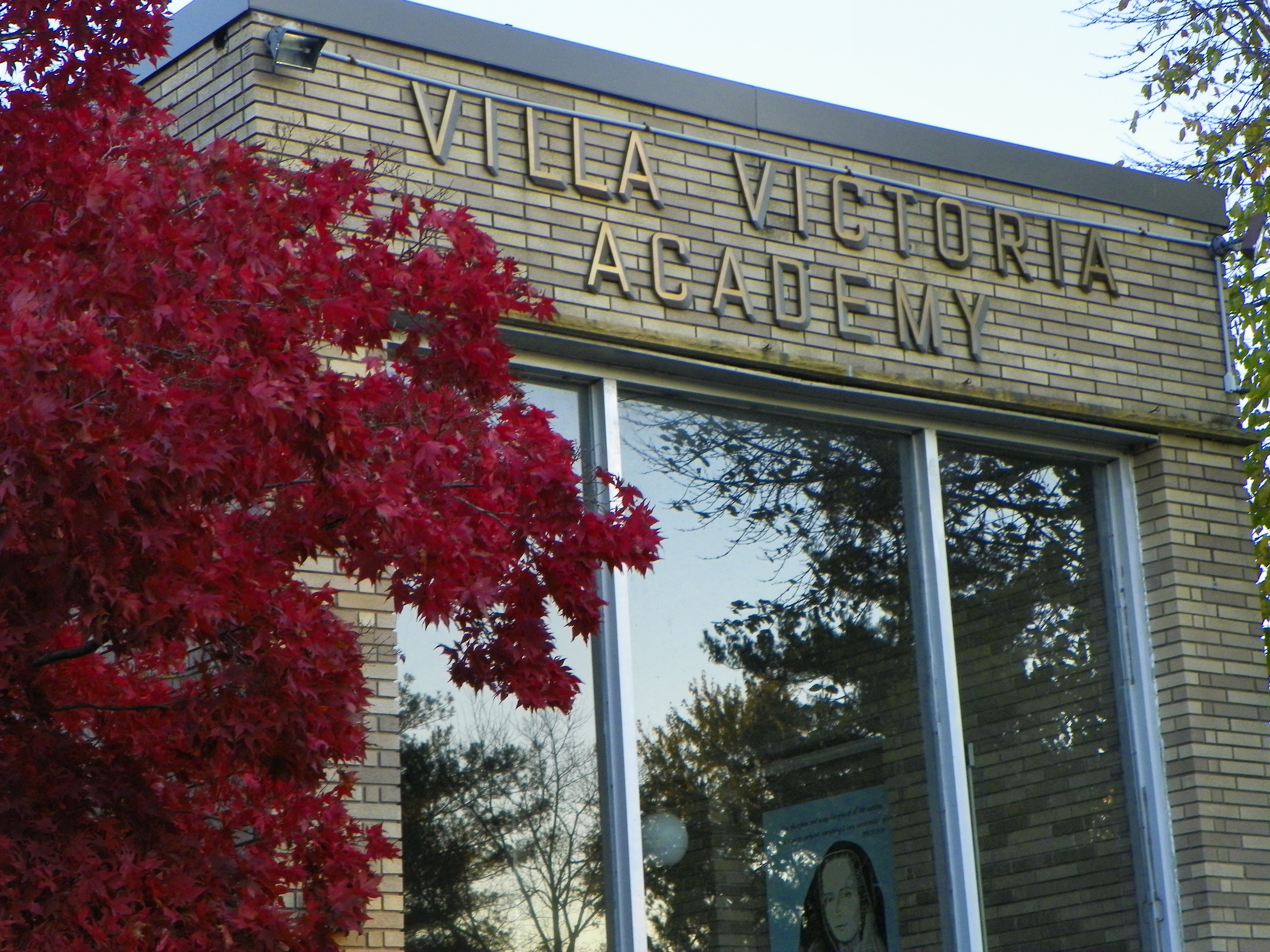

Location
- 376 West Upper Ferry Road; Ewing Township, (Mercer County), New Jersey 08628; United States; 40°15′20″N 74°50′30″W

Information
- Type: Private, All-Girls
- Motto: Preparing young women to be smart, strong, confident leaders since 1933
- Religious affiliation: Roman Catholic Church
- Patron saint: St. Lucy Filippini
- Established: 1933
- Founder: Religious Teachers Filippini
- School district: Diocese of Trenton
- NCES School ID: A9300564
- President: Sr. Lillian Harrington, MPF
- Chairperson: Chuck Machion, Chair of Board of Directors
- Director: Colleen White, Director of Admissions
- Principal: Sr. Lesley Draper
- Faculty: NA FTEs
- Grades: 6–12
- Student to teacher ratio: NA
- Campus size: 44 acres (180,000 m^{2})
- Colors: Burgundy and gray
- Athletics conference: Penn-Jersey Athletic Association
- Team name: Yellow Jackets
- Accreditation: Middle States Association of Colleges and Schools
- Publication: Inscape (literary magazine)
- Yearbook: Victorian
- School fees: $400-$450
- Tuition: $12,250 (6–8) $18,400 (9–12) for 2025–26
- Communities served: Mercer, Hunterdon and Burlington counties in New Jersey; Bucks County, Pennsylvania
- Alumni: about 1,600 alumnae
- Athletic Colors: Black and gold
- Website: www.villavictoria.org

Villa Victoria Academy is an all-girls, private, Catholic middle and high school located in the West Trenton section of Ewing Township, New Jersey. It is located in the Roman Catholic Diocese of Trenton. The school has been accredited by the Middle States Association of Colleges and Schools Commission on Elementary and Secondary Schools since 1996; Middle States accreditation of the school expires on January 1, 2029.

As of the 2023–24 school year, the school had an enrollment of 94 students.

== History ==
Then-Bishop of Trenton Thomas Walsh arranged the acquisition of the 44-acre (18 ha) Fisk Estate in 1920 with the assistance of New York-based Catholic philanthropist James Cox Brady. The new school and the surrounding estate were named after Brady's late wife, Victoria. Villa Victoria Academy was opened in 1933 by the Religious Teachers Filippini with a total of students. The school's first high school graduation took place in 1937.

The school and its campus would gradually expand over the following decades. Modern science laboratories were built in the 1950s, a new high school building was constructed during the 1960s, and a 990 seat auditorium was finished in the 1980s.

== Athletics ==
Villa Victoria competes in interscholastic sports as part of the Penn-Jersey Athletic Association. Athletic programs offered to students include soccer, basketball, cross country, track, tennis, golf and softball.

== Notable alumnae ==
- Amy Locane (born 1971), television and film actress who appeared in John Waters' 1990 musical comedy Cry-Baby and in the first season of the prime time soap opera Melrose Place.

== See also ==
- New Jersey Women's Hall of Fame Class of 2012 (Sr. Lillian Harrington, MPF, president)
