= Sacred Heart Church (Trenton, New Jersey) =

Historic church in New Jersey, United States

- Sacred Heart Parish, Trenton, New Jersey
- Sacred Heart Church
- Location: 343 S. Broad St, Trenton, NJ
- Country: United States
- Denomination: Roman Catholic
- Website: http://www.trentonsacredheart.org/

History
- Dedicated: June 30, 1889

Administration
- Archdiocese: Archdiocese of Newark
- Diocese: Diocese of Trenton

- Sacred Heart Church
- U.S. National Register of Historic Places
- New Jersey Register of Historic Places
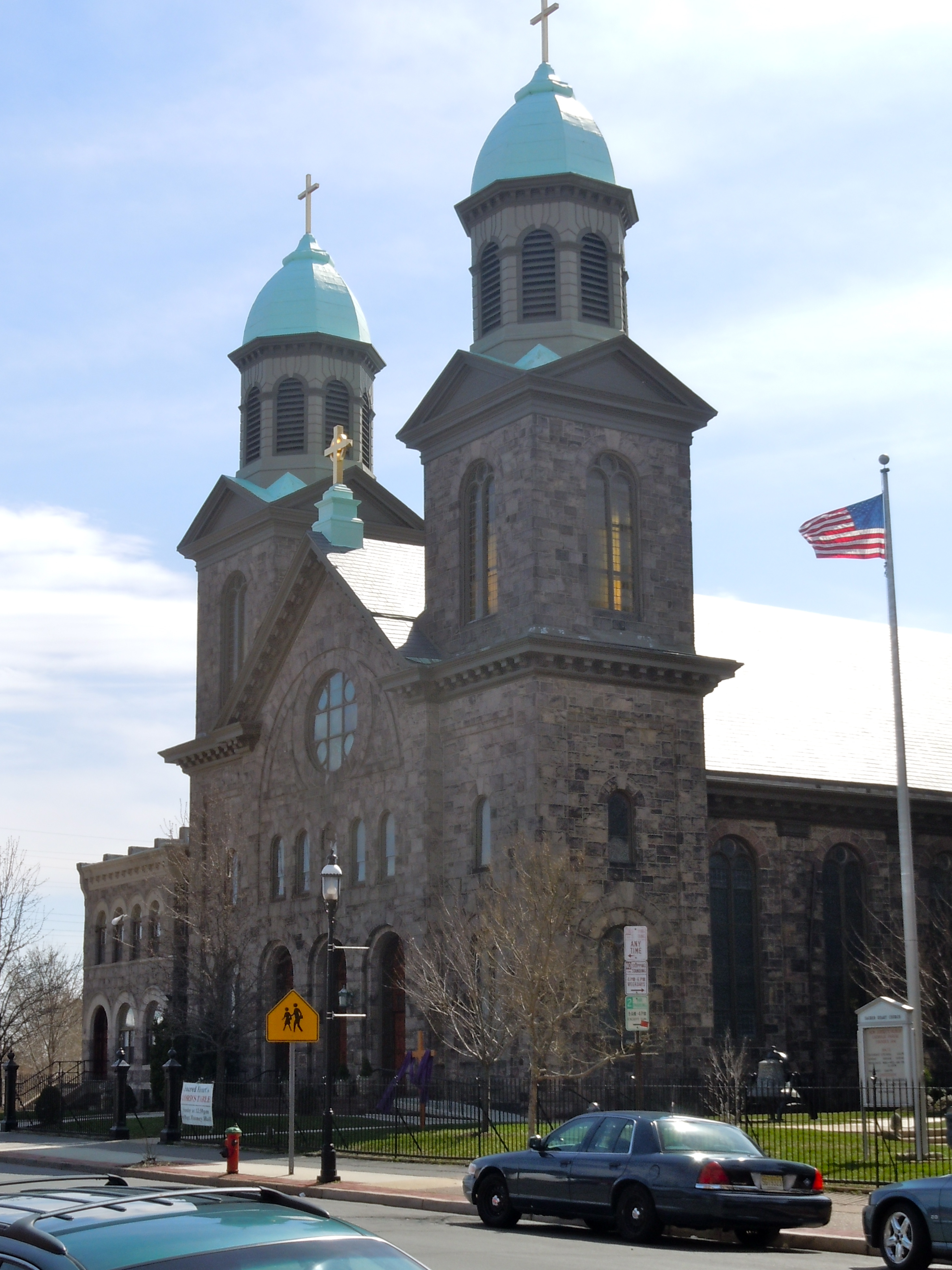

- Location within Mercer County, New Jersey Location within New Jersey Location within the United States
- Location: 343 S. Broad St., Trenton, New Jersey
- Coordinates: 40°12′59″N 74°45′40″W
- Area: 2 acres (0.81 ha)
- Built: 1889
- Architect: Patrick C. Keely; William A. Poland
- Architectural style: Classical Revival, Romanesque
- NRHP reference No.: 02000434
- NJRHP No.: 3955

Significant dates
- Added to NRHP: May 02, 2002
- Designated NJRHP: January 18, 2002

Sacred Heart Church is a historic church at 343 South Broad Street in Trenton, Mercer County, New Jersey, United States.

It was built in 1889 and added to the National Register of Historic Places on May 2, 2002. The church was dedicated on June 30, 1889.
