= John J. McMahon (bishop) =

American prelate

His Excellency, The Most Reverend John Joseph McMahon
- Bishop of Trenton
- See: Diocese of Trenton
- In office: 1928-1932
- Predecessor: Thomas J. Walsh
- Successor: Moses E. Kiley

Orders
- Ordination: May 20, 1900 by Giuseppe Ceppetelli
- Consecration: April 26, 1929 by William Turner

Personal details
- Born: September 27, 1875 Hinsdale, New York, US
- Died: December 31, 1932 (aged 57) Buffalo, New York, US
- Denomination: Roman Catholic
- Education: St. Bonaventure College; Pontifical Urbaniana University
- Motto: Nos novi per gratiam (I know us by grace)

John Joseph McMahon (September 27, 1875 – December 31, 1932) was an American prelate of the Roman Catholic Church. He served as bishop of the Diocese of Trenton in New Jersey from 1928 until his death in 1932.

== Biography ==
=== Early life ===
John McMahon was born on September 27, 1875, in Hinsdale, New York. He graduated from Union High School in 1893. McMahon then attended St. Bonaventure University in Allegany, New York, earning a Bachelor of Arts degree. He completed his theological studies at the Pontifical Urbaniana University in Rome.

=== Priesthood ===
McMahon was ordained to the priesthood by Patriarch Giuseppe Ceppetelli in Rome for the Diocese of Buffalo on May 20, 1900. On returning to New York, the diocese assigned McMahon as a curate in parishes in Jamestown, New York, and Buffalo. He was later named pastor of a parish in Newfane, New York. He also served as assistant superintendent of diocesan schools and director of the Holy Name Society in the diocese.

=== Bishop of Trenton ===
On March 2, 1928, McMahon was appointed the fourth bishop of Trenton by Pope Pius XI. He received his episcopal consecration on April 26, 1928, from Bishop William Turner, with Bishops Thomas Walsh and Edmund Gibbons serving as co-consecrators, at St. Joseph's Cathedral in Buffalo. He was installed at St. Mary's Cathedral in Trenton, New Jersey, on May 10, 1928.

After four years as bishop, John McMahon died in Buffalo at age 57 on December 31, 1932.

Catholic Church titles
Preceded by Thomas J. Walsh	Bishop of Trenton; 1928–1932	Succeeded by Moses E. Kiley
