= Co-Cathedral of St. Robert Bellarmine =

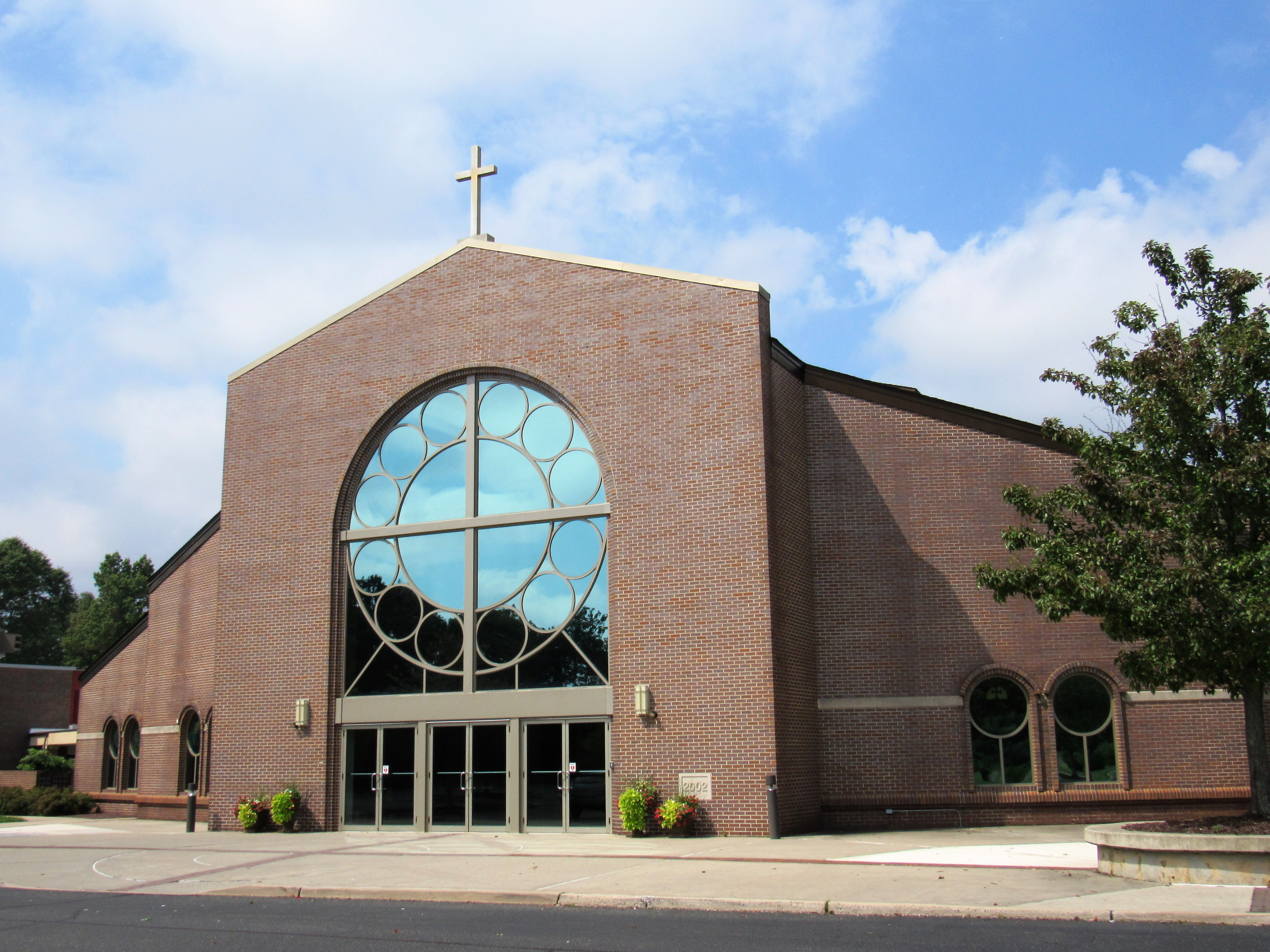

- Location within Monmouth County, New Jersey
- 40°12′54.5″N 74°17′34.2″W
- Location: 61 Georgia Rd. Freehold, New Jersey
- Country: United States
- Denomination: Roman Catholic Church
- Website: www.strobert.cc

History
- Status: Co-Cathedral/Parish church
- Founded: 1971
- Dedication: Robert Bellarmine
- Dedicated: December 7, 2002

Architecture
- Completed: 2002

Specifications
- Capacity: 1,100
- Materials: Brick

Administration
- Diocese: Trenton

Clergy
- Bishop: Most Rev. David M. O'Connell
- Rector: Rev. Msgr. Sam A. Sirianni

The Co-Cathedral of St. Robert Bellarmine is a Catholic co-cathedral and parish church located in Freehold, New Jersey, United States. Along with the Cathedral of St. Mary of the Assumption in Trenton it is the seat of the Diocese of Trenton. The parish was founded in 1971, the church building was dedicated in 2002, and it became a co-cathedral in 2017.

== History ==
St. Robert's parish was founded in 1971 as the number of professionals from New York City and North Jersey started to relocate to this section of Monmouth County. A multi-purpose building was constructed to serve the parish's needs. As the parish grew in numbers and financial stability plans were drawn up for a new church, which was completed in 2002.

Because of its central location in the diocese, the parish facilities were used for a variety of diocesan functions. After consulting with the parish and priests of the diocese, Bishop David M. O'Connell petitioned the Congregation for Bishops at the Holy See on April 11, 2016, to have the Church of St. Robert Bellarmine elevated to a co-cathedral. It was approved on December 3 of the same year, and the parish was informed on Christmas Eve. The church was officially dedicated as a cathedral on February 19, 2017.

== Architecture ==
The large brick modern church building has elements from the Romanesque style. It features a gathering space, large rose window and clerestory. The stained glass windows depict the Mysteries of the Rosary, American saints, and St. Robert Bellarmine, the parish patron. The interior is an open space without columns, and a seating capacity of 1,100. The altar platform is composed of white marble, and the altar, tabernacle pedestal and ambo are green Carrara marble.

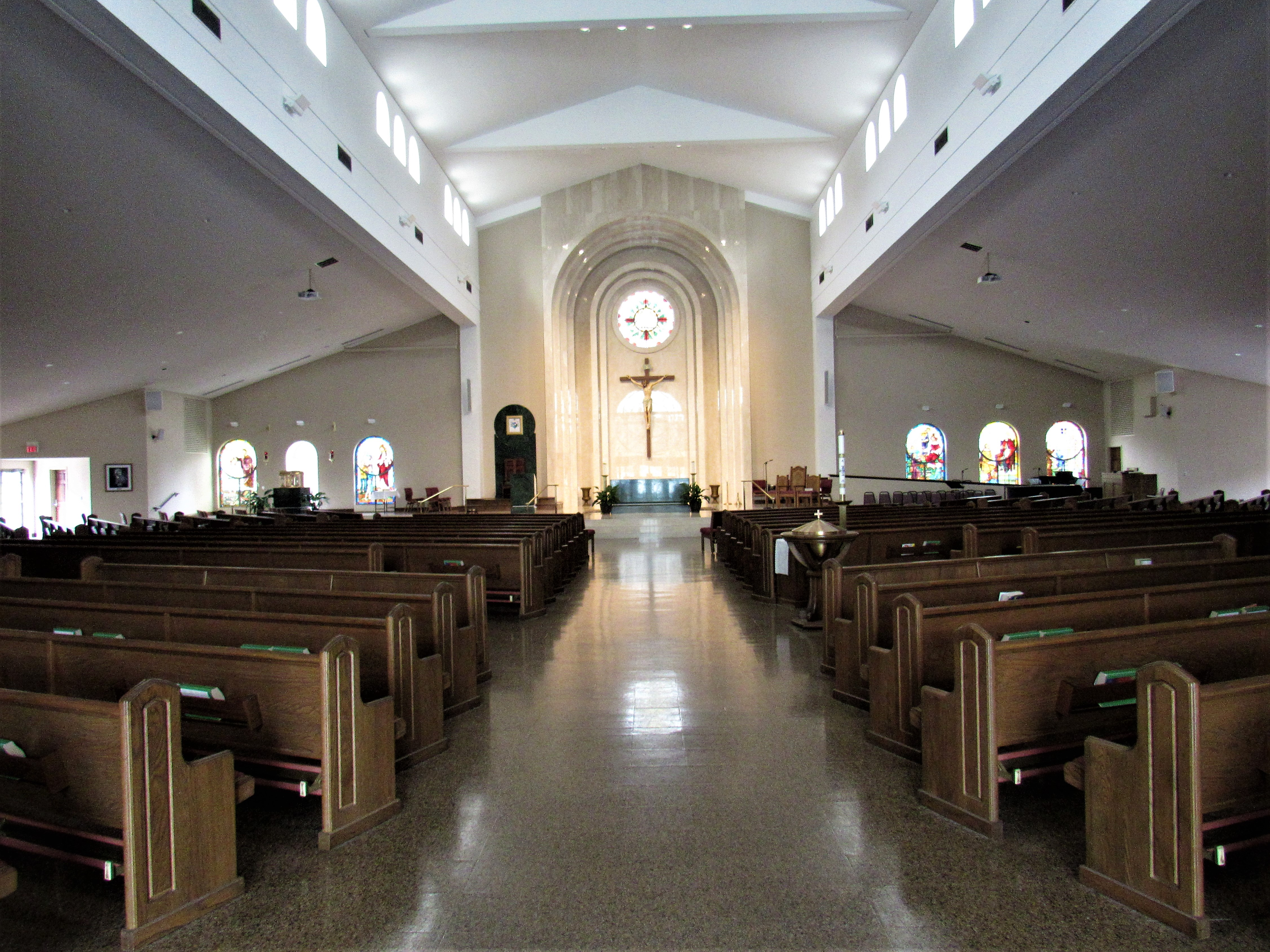
Interior toward altar

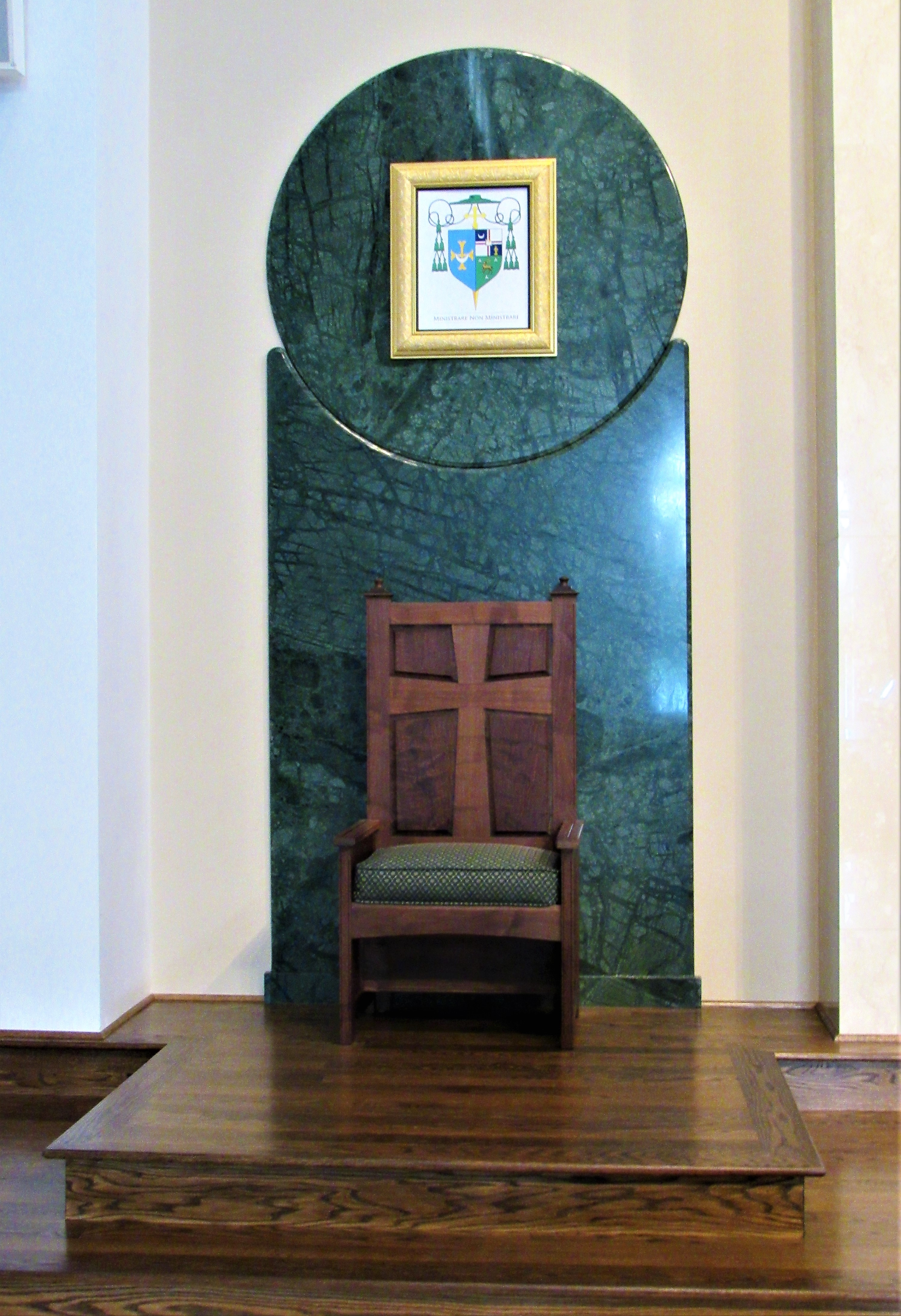
Cathedra

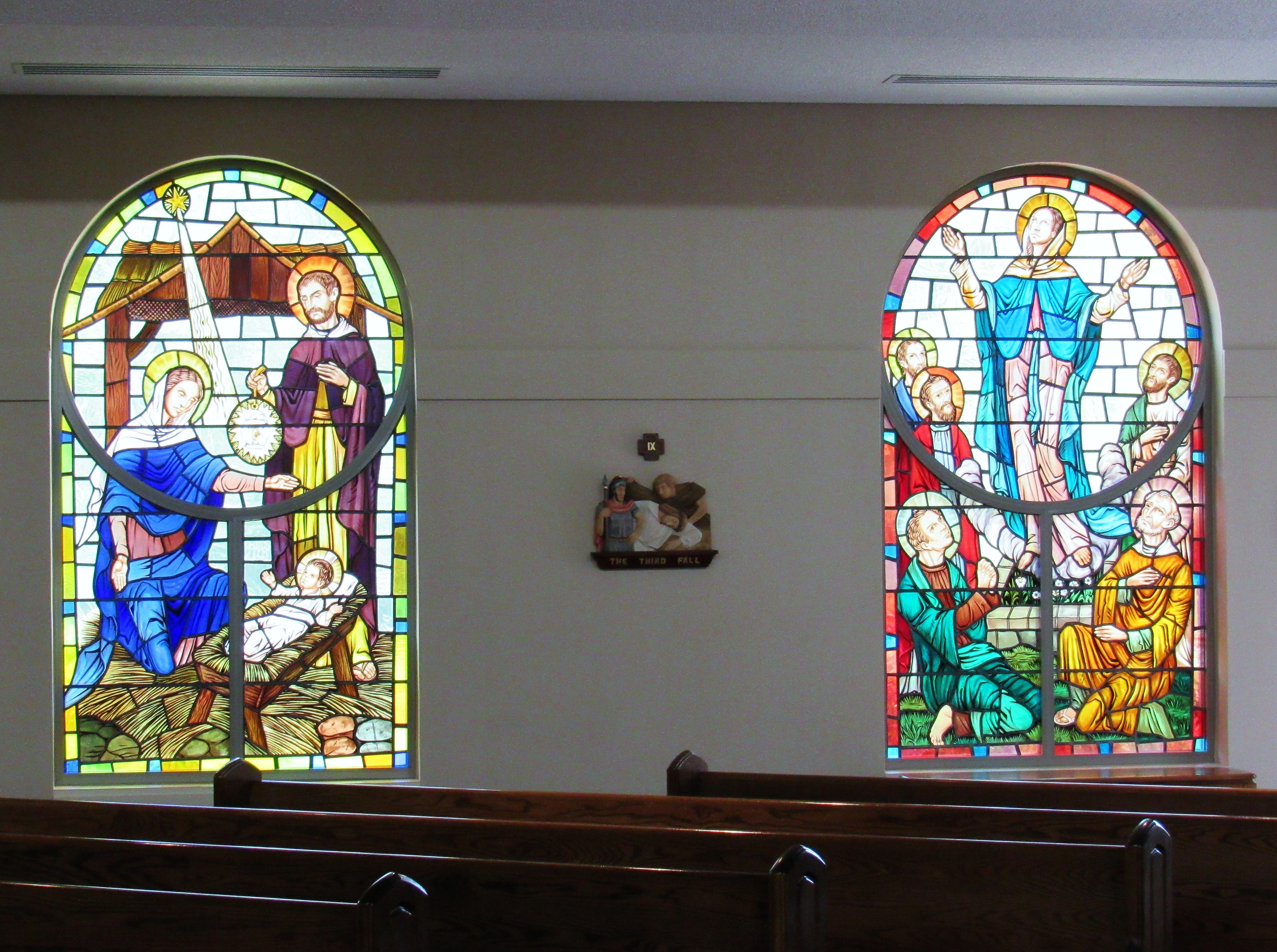
Stained glass windows

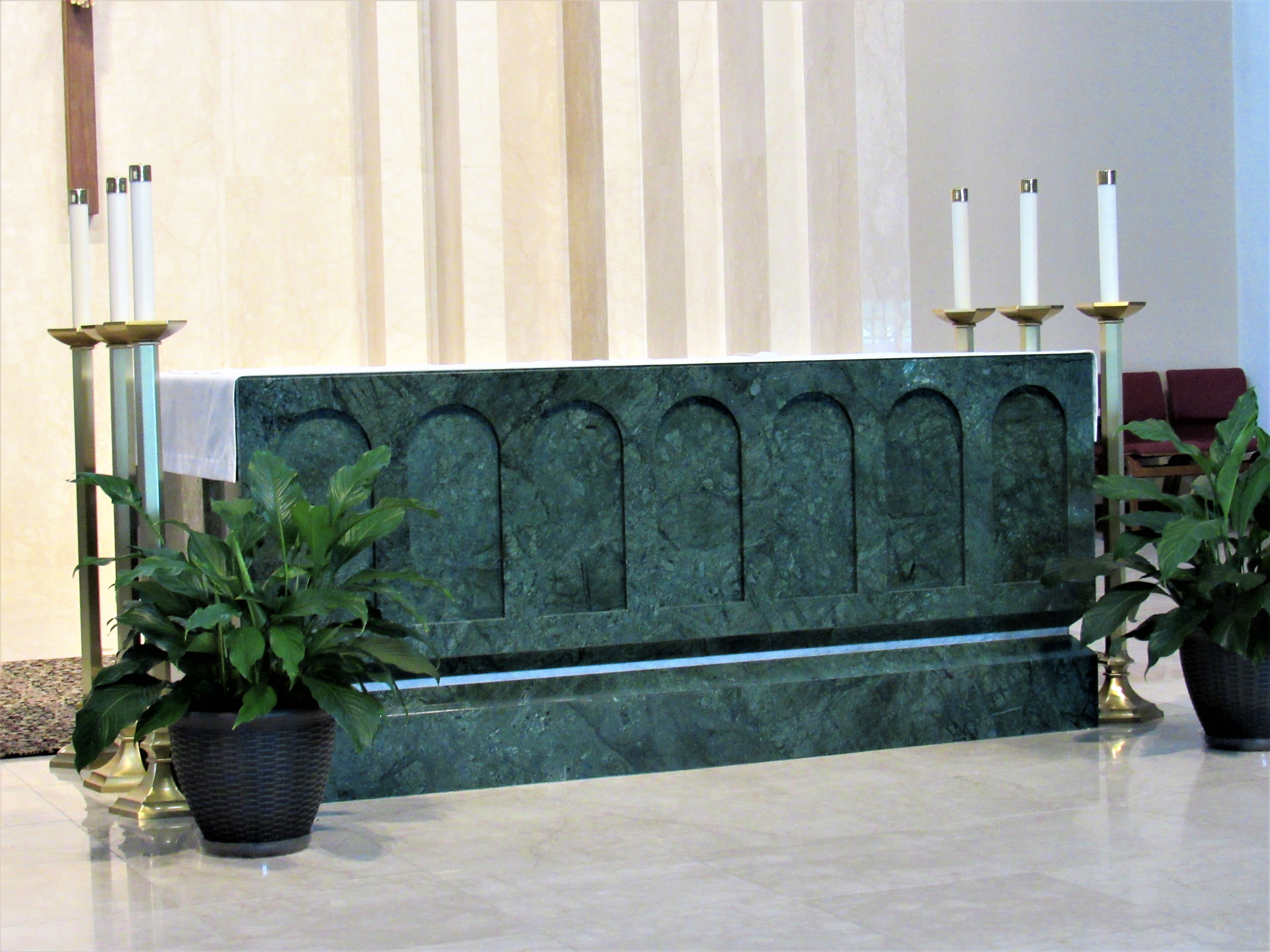
Altar

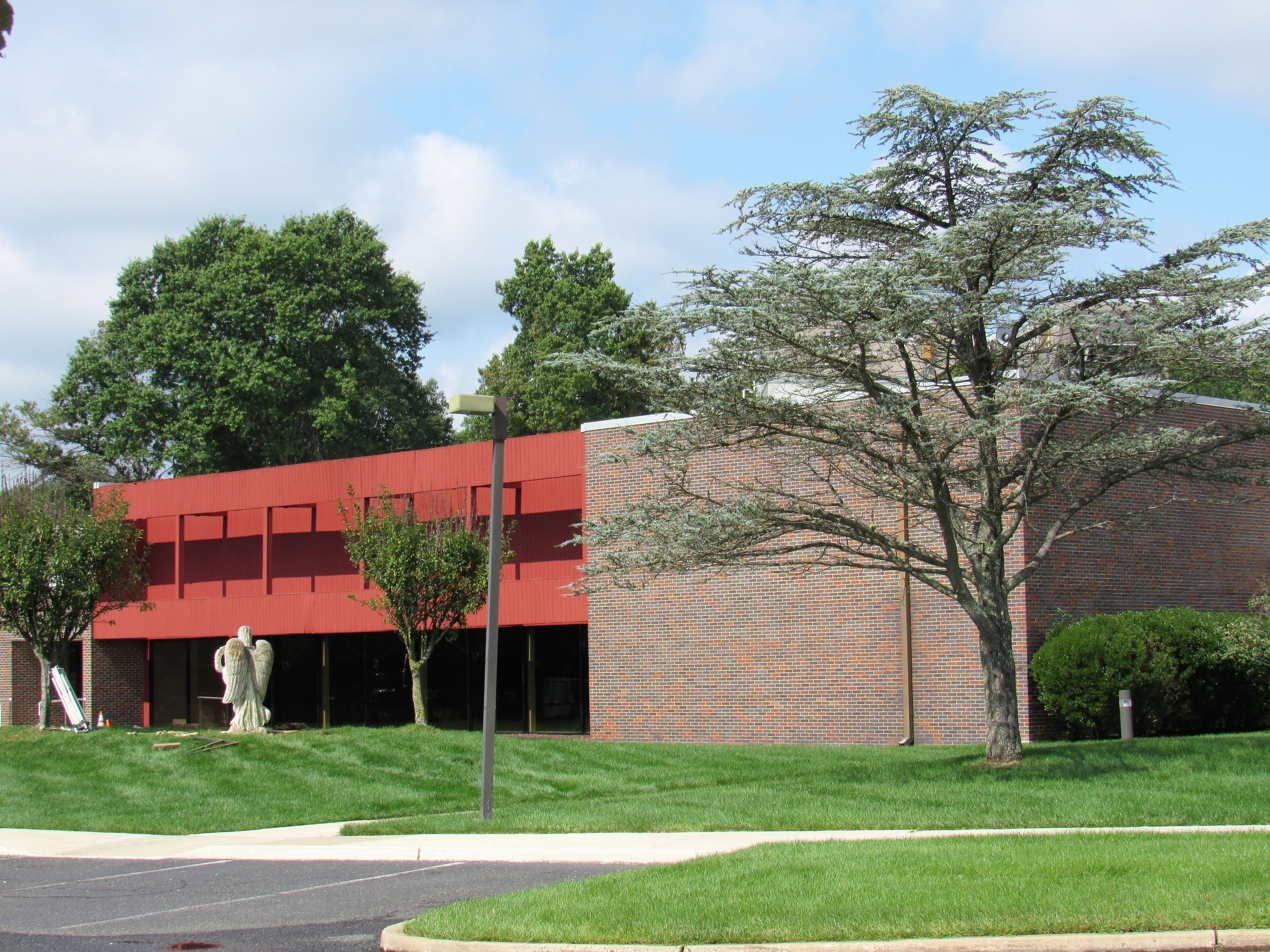
Parish Center

== See also ==
- List of Catholic cathedrals in the United States
- List of cathedrals in the United States
