= John McMahon (footballer, born 1965) =

English footballer

Personal information
- Full name: John Albert McMahon
- Date of birth: 25 October 1965
- Place of birth: Middlesbrough, England
- Position: Forward

Youth career
- –: Middlesbrough

Senior career*
Years	Team	Apps	(Gls)
1983–1985	Middlesbrough	0	(0)
1985	Darlington	4	(0)
- Guisborough Town
- * Club domestic league appearances and goals

John Albert McMahon (born 25 October 1965) is an English former footballer who played as a forward in the Football League on a non-contract basis for Darlington. He was an apprentice with Middlesbrough, and also played non-league football for Guisborough Town.

McMahon joined Darlington in March 1985 and made four substitute appearances without scoring as the club were promoted from the Fourth Division. He started three Associate Members' Cup matches; in the first round second leg, he scored a hat-trick as Darlington beat Halifax Town 7–0 to overturn a 4–1 deficit from the first leg.
