= John McMahon (Australian footballer, born 1900) =

Australian rules footballer, born 1900

Personal information
- Full name: John Sydney McMahon
- Born: 4 October 1900; South Yarra, Victoria
- Died: 17 February 1962 (aged 61); Rutherglen, Victoria
- Original team: South Yarra
- Height: 165 cm (5 ft 5 in)
- Weight: 56 kg (123 lb)

Playing career^{1}
Years	Club	Games (Goals)
1919	Melbourne	3 (0)
- ^{1} Playing statistics correct to the end of 1919.

John Sydney McMahon was an Australian rules footballer who played with Melbourne in the Victorian Football League (VFL).
