= Diocese of Trenton =

Latin Catholic ecclesiastical jurisdiction in New Jersey, USA

Coordinates: 40°13′18″N 74°45′22″W

Diocese of Trenton Dioecesis Trentonensis
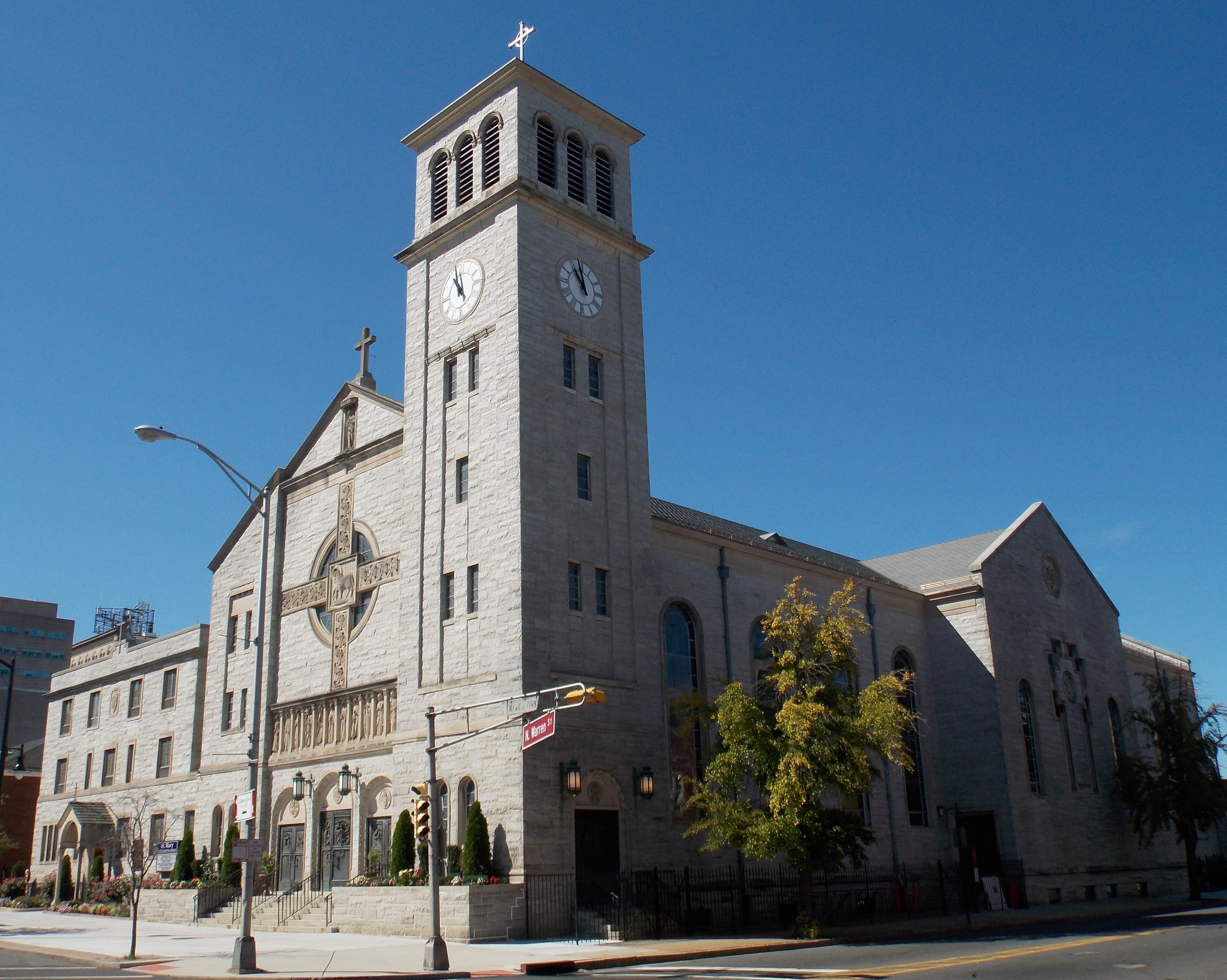
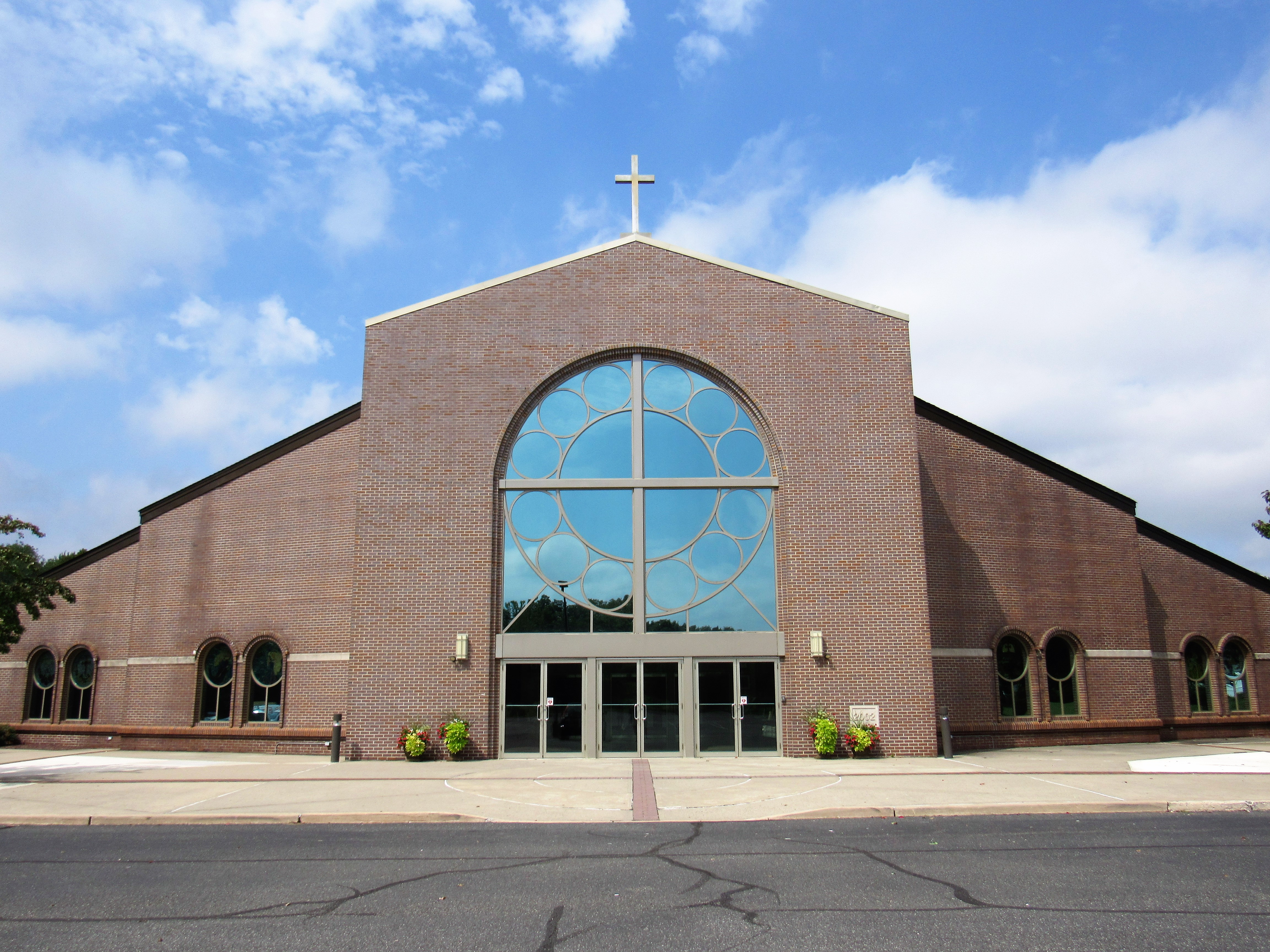
- Cathedral of St. Mary of the Assumption Co-Cathedral of St. Robert Bellarmine

- Coat of Arms of the Diocese of Trenton

Location
- Country: United States
- Territory: South-Central New Jersey counties of Burlington, Mercer, Monmouth, and Ocean
- Ecclesiastical province: Newark

Statistics
- Population: Total; Catholics: 2,130,044; 850,000 (42%)
- Parishes: 109

Information
- Denomination: Catholic
- Sui iuris church: Latin Church
- Rite: Roman Rite
- Established: August 2, 1881
- Cathedral: Cathedral of Saint Mary of the Assumption, Trenton
- Co-cathedral: Co-Cathedral of St. Robert Bellarmine, Freehold
- Patron saint: Blessed Virgin Mary

Current leadership
- Pope: Leo XIV
- Bishop: David M. O'Connell
- Metropolitan Archbishop: Joseph Tobin
- Vicar General: Rev. Msgr. Thomas N. Gervasio
- Judicial Vicar: Rev. Oscar B. Sumanga, J.C.D.

Map
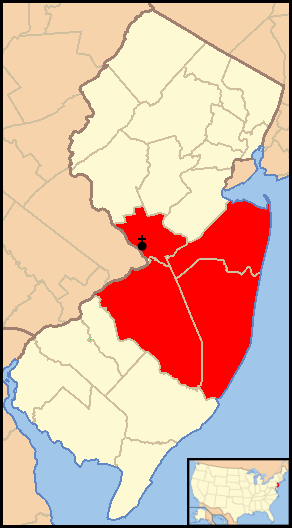

Website
- dioceseoftrenton.org

The Diocese of Trenton is a diocese of the Catholic Church in central New Jersey in the United States. It is a suffragan diocese of the Archdiocese of Newark. The mother church is the Cathedral of St. Mary of the Assumption in Trenton with the Co-Cathedral of St. Robert Bellarmine in Freehold. The bishop is David M. O'Connell.

== Territory ==
The Diocese of Trenton encompasses Burlington, Mercer, Monmouth, and Ocean counties. In 2021, it had a population of 774,000 Catholics.

== History ==
=== 1700 to 1800 ===
Although the British Provinces of East Jersey and West Jersey were not officially welcoming to Catholics, they tended to ignore their presence. The first resident priest in West Jersey was Jesuit Joseph Greaton, who arrived around 1732. In 1744, Theodore Schneider was visiting the families of Catholic ironworkers in the southern part of the territory. In 1764, Ferdinand Steinmeyer took over this duty.

The assistance of Catholic French troops during the American Revolution helped to abate anti-Catholic sentiment in all of the 13 original colonies. In 1784, Pope Pius VI erected the Apostolic Prefecture of the United States of America, including all of the new United States. In 1789, the same pope raised this prefecture to the Diocese of Baltimore.

=== 1800 to 1881 ===
The first Catholic mass in Trenton was celebrated in the printing office of Isaac Collins around 1804. In 1811, the services were moved to the home of John Baptist Sartori, a consular official who represented the commercial interests of the Papal States in the United States. To accommodate the increasing number of worshipers, Bishop Michael Egan of Philadelphia worked with local backers to construct St. John the Baptist in 1814, the first Catholic parish in New Jersey.

When Pope Pius VII erected the Diocese of New York and the Diocese of Philadelphia in 1808, he split the new state of New Jersey between the two dioceses. However, when Pope Pius IX erected the Diocese of Newark in 1853, he reunited the state of New Jersey as its initial territory. The Trenton area would remain part of the Diocese of Newark for the next 28 years.

In 1865, Anthony Smith purchased the site of the present-day Cathedral of St. Mary of the Assumption. It had previously served as the headquarters for Hessian troops during the Battle of Trenton in December 1776. Construction of the church began in 1866, and Bishop James Bayley of Newark dedicated the new cathedral in 1871. The Catholic population of New Jersey grew rapidly, from 25,000 in 1860 to 130,000 in 1880.In 1874, the Sisters of St. Francis of Philadelphia opened St. Francis Hospital in Trenton.

=== 1881 to 1900 ===
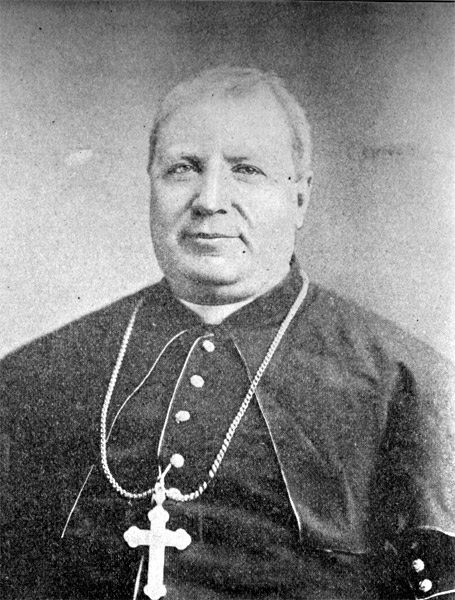
Bishop O'Farrell (pre-1894)

In 1881, Pope Leo XIII erected the Diocese of Trenton, taking southern and central New Jersey from the Diocese of Newark. The pope designated the Church of St. Mary of the Assumption as its cathedral and appointed Michael J. O'Farrell of New York as the first bishop of Trenton. At this time, the diocese had 68 churches, 23 parochial schools, and 51 priests.

According to historian John Shea, O'Farrell's efforts to establish Catholic institutions in South Jersey "...did not fail to excite hostility". St. John the Baptist Church, the first Catholic church in the diocese, burned down in 1883 in a suspected arson attack. During his tenure, O'Farrell erected several new parishes and missions, and established an orphanage in New Brunswick and a home for the elderly in Beverly. When O'Farrell died in 1884, the diocese contained 92 priests, 101 churches, and 82 parochial schools.

In 1894, James McFaul was appointed the second bishop. New Jersey's Catholic population continued to grow with immigration from Italy and eastern Europe. In 1898, McFaul erected St. Michael's Orphanage at Hopewell, to be operated by the Sisters of St. Francis of Philadelphia. McFaul also opened in Lawrence the Morris Hall Home for the Aged in 1904. In 1906, the Sisters of Mercy opened Mount Saint Mercy and College, a high school and college for girls in Watchung.

=== 1900 to 1950 ===
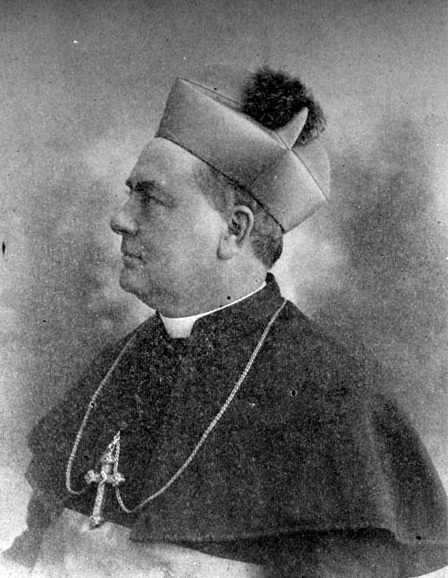
Bishop McFaul (1918)

In 1909, McFaul created a controversy when he accused the professors at American colleges and universities of an "upbuilding of a cynicism and intimacy with immoral ideas." In 1910, the Religious Teachers Filippini entered the diocese to work among the Italian immigrants in St. Joachim's Parish in South Trenton. McFaul established Catholic Charities in Trenton in 1913.

After McFaul died in 1917, Pope Benedict XV appointed Thomas Walsh as the third bishop of Trenton. The college division of Mount Saint Mary was moved in 1924 to Lakewood, where it became Georgian Court College. It is today Georgian Court University. Walsh in 1927 dedicated the new St. James High School in Monmouth County. Walsh in 1927 became bishop of Newark.

John J. McMahon of Buffalo was the next bishop of Trenton, named by Pope Pius XI in 1928. He died four years later in 1932. In 1933, the Religious Teachers Filippini established Villa Victoria Academy, an all-girls middle and high school, in Mercer County. To replace McMahon, Pius XI appointed Monsignor Moses E. Kiley of the Archdiocese of Chicago as bishop of Trenton. McMahon died in 1932.

In 1934, Kiley was appointed the fifth bishop of Trenton by Pope Pius XI. His most notable achievement in Trenton was refinancing $10,000,000 of church obligations. In 1937, Pope Pius XI erected the Diocese of Camden, taking its territory, taking South Jersey from the Diocese of Trenton. The Diocese of Trenton now had a Catholic population of 210,114 in eight counties with 212 diocesan priests, 121 parishes and 70 parochial schools. Kiley became archbishop of the Archdiocese of Milwaukee in 1940. Auxiliary Bishop William A. Griffin of Trenton was named bishop of diocese in 1940 by Pope Pius XII.

=== 1950 to 1997 ===
After ten years as bishop, Griffin died in 1950. The next bishop of Trenton was George W. Ahr of Newark, appointed by Pius XII in 1950. During Ahr’s tenure, the number of Catholics in the diocese rose from 300,000 to 850,000. He founded 50 parishes and dedicated 100 new churches, 90 schools, and over 60 other buildings. In 1956, fire destroyed St. Mary's Cathedral, killing its rector, Richard T. Crean, and two housekeepers. Bishop Ahr guided the implementation of liturgical reforms from the Second Vatican Council after 1965. He retired in 1979 after 29 years as bishop of Trenton.

In 1980, Pope John Paul II selected Auxiliary Bishop John C. Reiss of Trenton as Ahr's successor as bishop. Later that year, the pope erected the Diocese of Metuchen, taking four counties from the Diocese of Trenton. At this juncture, the Diocese of Trenton had 447,915 parishioners in 119 parishes served by 193 diocesan priests and 105 religious priests.

In 1995, John Paul II appointed Bishop John M. Smith as coadjutor bishop in Trenton to assist Reiss. Villa Vianney, a residence for retired priests, was completed in 1995 and the new diocesan pastoral center in 1997. When Reiss retired in 1997, Smith succeeded him as bishop of Trenton.

=== 1997 to 2010 ===
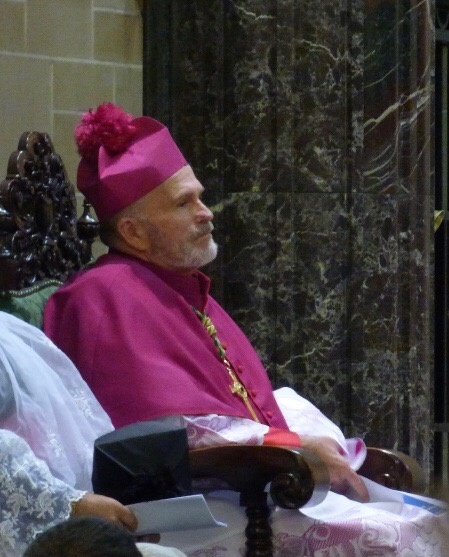
Bishop O'Connell (2021)

Smith launched the diocesan website in 2000. He also championed the diocese's teen talk show, Realfaith TV, which was televised and webcast throughout North America. Smith created the Institute for Lay Ecclesial Ministry to prepare permanent deacons for service. Smith set forth "The 11 Elements of a Vibrant Parish" in 2000, which reduced the number of parishes in the diocese to 111.

In 2002, the diocese completed the construction of the Church of St. Robert Bellarmine in Freehold Township. The diocese began using this church for diocesan functions because it offered a more central location in the diocese than the cathedral.

=== 2010 to present ===
In 2010, Pope Benedict XVI named David M. O'Connell, president of Catholic University of America in Washington, D.C. as coadjutor bishop of Trenton. When Smith retired in 2010, O'Connell became the next bishop of Trenton.

In 2017, the Vatican elevated Church of St. Robert Bellarmine to the status of co-cathedral at O'Connell's request. In January 2024, O'Connell suffered a heart attack in Rome. He received surgery at a hospital there to unblock his left anterior descending artery.

St. Leo the Great Parish of Lincroft, New Jersey, sued its former its former finance director, Joseph Manzi, in August 2025. It accused Manzi of embezzling $1.5 million of parish funds. He was indicted on theft charges in October 2025.

=== Sexual abuse ===
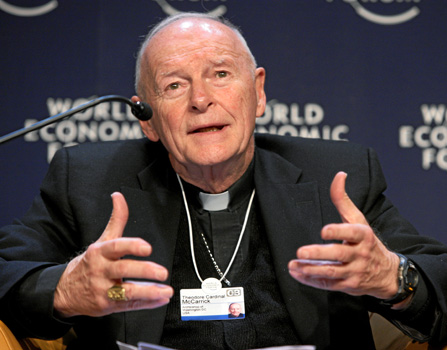
Former Cardinal McCarrick (2008)

The Diocese of Trenton removed Ron Becker, a priest at St. Francis Roman Catholic Church in Trenton, from ministry after receiving complaints of sexual abuse. The Vatican laicized him in 2002. In March 2007, he was arrested on sexual assault charges. His accuser was his niece Jenni Franz, who said that Becker abused her from ages five to 11. Franz reported his abuse to the diocese in 2004. Becker pleaded guilty to one count of second-degree sexual assault in June 2007, but died before sentencing. The diocese in 2009 paid a $325,000 settlement to Franz. In 2011, the diocese paid a second settlement exceeding $1 million to five former altar boys who were sexually assaulted by Becker in the 1970s and 1980s.

Romannilo Apura, a priest of St. Martha Parish in Point Pleasant, was arrested in August 2014 on charges of endangering the welfare of a child, third-degree aggravated criminal sexual contact, and fourth-degree attempt to commit criminal sexual contact. Apura pleaded guilty in August 2015 to aggravated criminal sexual contact and was sentenced to three years in prison.

In February 2019, the diocese released the names of 30 clergy who had been credibly accused of sexually abusing minors since 1940. The diocese in April 2022 announced an $87.5 million settlement to 300 victims of sexual abuse by its clergy.

== Bishops ==
=== Bishops of Trenton ===
1. Michael J. O'Farrell (1881–1894)
2. James A. McFaul (1894–1917)
3. Thomas J. Walsh (1917–1928), appointed Bishop and later Archbishop of Newark
4. John J. McMahon (1928–1932)
5. Moses E. Kiley (1934–1940), appointed Archbishop of Milwaukee
6. William A. Griffin (1940–1950)
7. George W. Ahr (1950–1979)
8. John C. Reiss (1980–1997)
9. John M. Smith (1997–2010; coadjutor bishop 1995–1997)
10. David M. O'Connell (2010–present; coadjutor bishop 2010)

=== Former auxiliary bishops ===
- James John Hogan (1959–1966), appointed Bishop of Altoona-Johnstown
- John C. Reiss (1967–1980), appointed Bishop of Trenton
- Edward Kmiec (1982–1992), appointed Bishop of Nashville

== Education ==
=== High schools ===
- Christian Brothers Academy*, Lincroft
- Donovan Catholic High School, Toms River (known as St. Joseph High School until 1983 and Monsignor Donovan High School until 2014)
- Holy Cross Preparatory Academy*, Delran
- Notre Dame High School, Lawrenceville
- Red Bank Catholic, Red Bank
- St. John Vianney High School, Holmdel
- St. Rose High School, Belmar
- Stuart Country Day School of the Sacred Heart*, Princeton
- Trinity Hall*, Tinton Falls
- Villa Victoria Academy*, Ewing Township

*Operates independently with the concurrence of the diocese.
