= Cathedral of St. Mary of the Assumption (Trenton, New Jersey) =

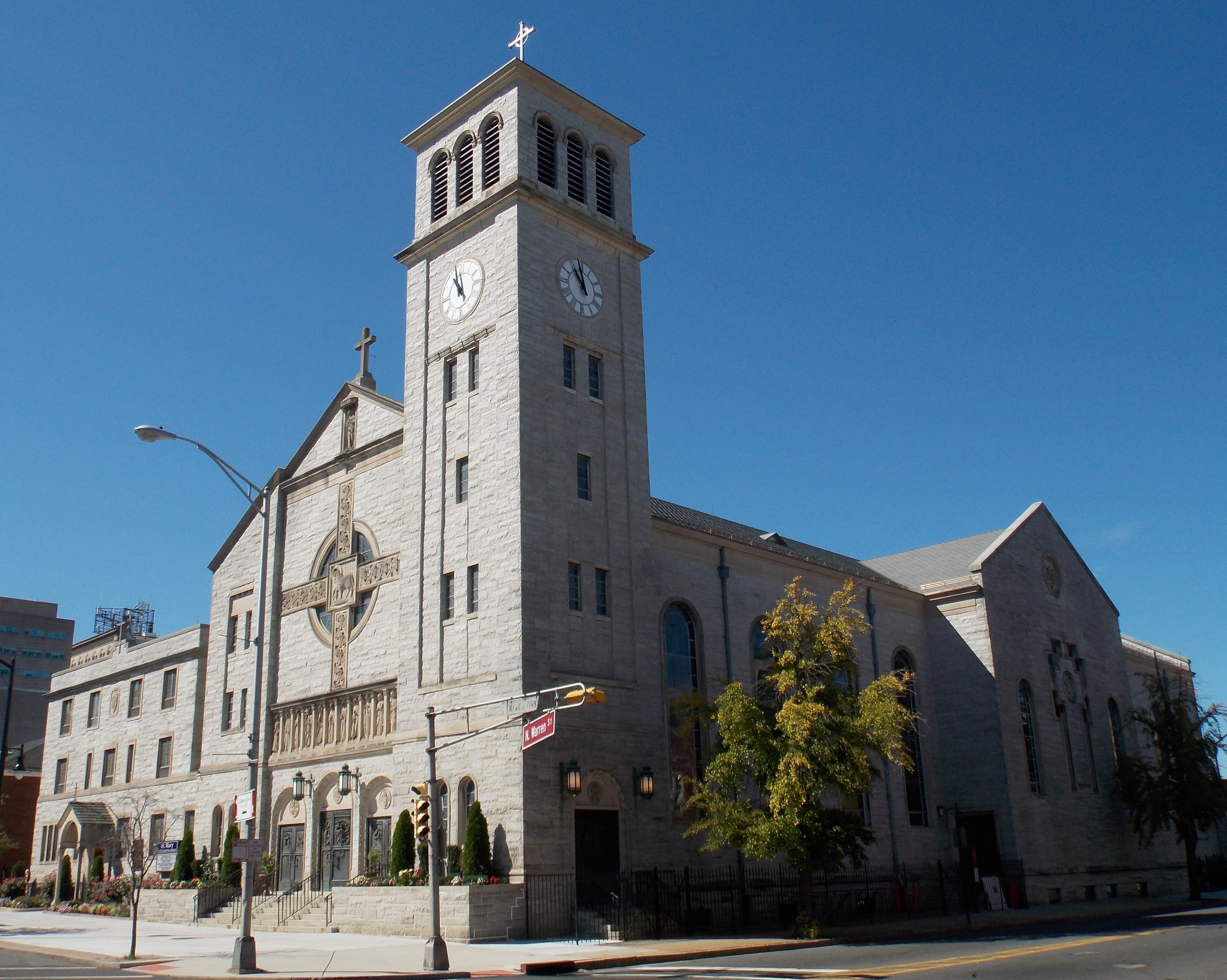
- St. Mary's rectory (left) and cathedral

- Location in Mercer County, New Jersey
- 40°13′22″N 74°45′58″W
- Location: 151 N. Warren St. Trenton, New Jersey
- Country: United States
- Denomination: Roman Catholic Church
- Website: www.saintmaryscathedral-trenton.org

History
- Founded: 1865
- Dedicated: March 14, 1959

Architecture
- Architectural type: Modern Romanesque
- Completed: 1959

Specifications
- Materials: Mount Airy granite

Administration
- Diocese: Trenton

Clergy
- Bishop(s): Most Rev. David M. O'Connell, C.M.
- Rector: Msgr. Joseph Roldan

The Cathedral of St. Mary of the Assumption, also known simply as St. Mary's Cathedral, is a Catholic cathedral in Trenton, New Jersey, in the United States. Along with the Co-Cathedral of St. Robert Bellarmine in Freehold, it is the seat of the Diocese of Trenton.

St. Mary of the Assumption Church was dedicated in 1871; it was designated as the Cathedral of St. Mary of the Assumption in 1881. Destroyed by fire in 1956, the cathedral was rebuilt and dedicated in 1959.

== History ==
=== St. Mary of the Assumption Church ===
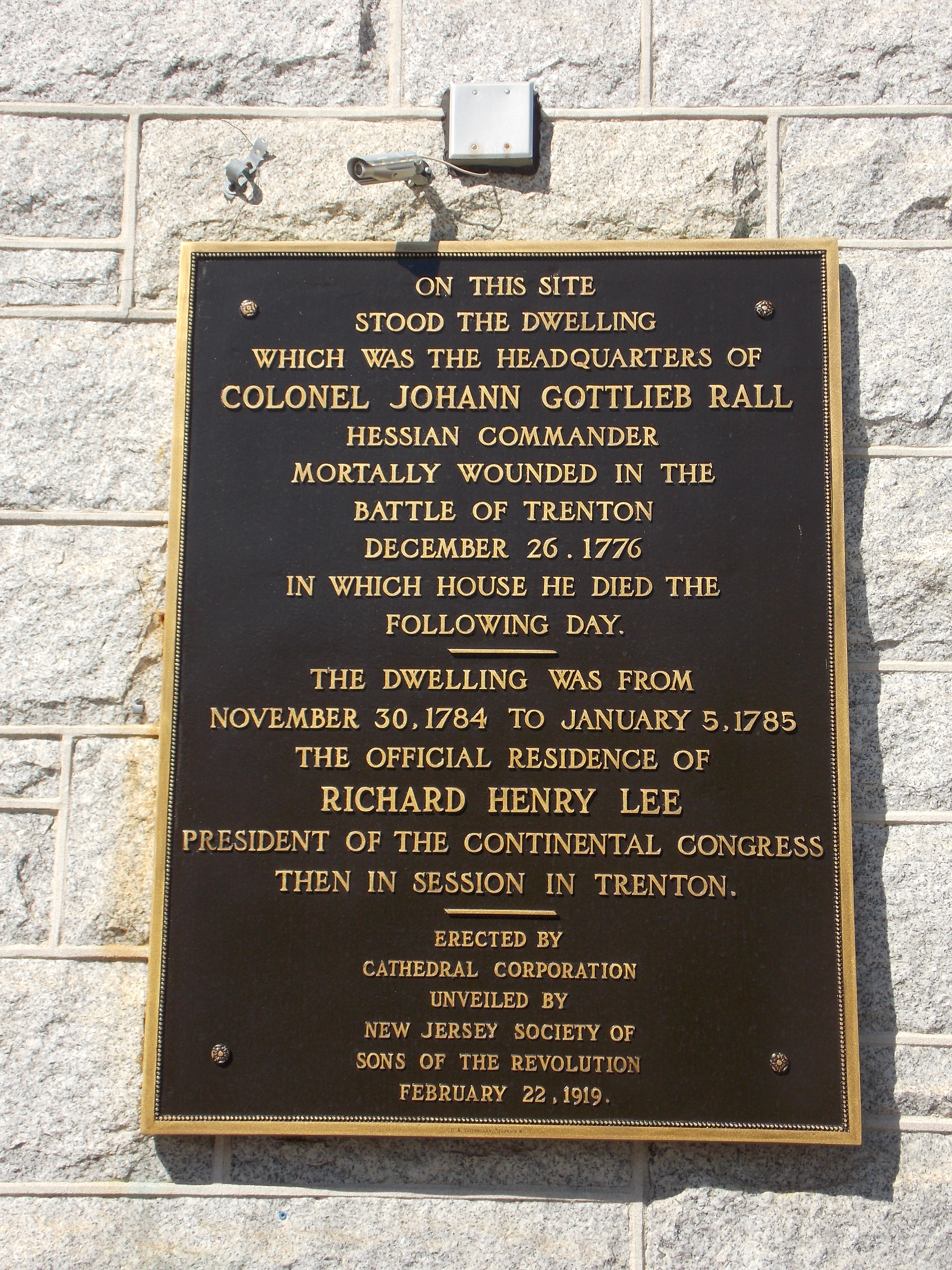
Historical marker on rectory commemorating Colonel Johann Gottlieb Rall (2014)

Reverend Anthony Smith purchased the property on which St. Mary's Cathedral now sits in 1865 from Dr. Jacob Quick. The location had been a part of the battlefield during the 1776 Battle of Trenton in the American Revolutionary War. A historical marker on the rectory identifies the location where the Hessian commander, Colonel Johann Gottlieb Rall, died on December 27, 1776.

St. Mary's was the second Catholic parish established in Trenton. The groundbreaking for St. Mary's Church was held on April 23, 1866; it was dedicated on January 1, 1871, by Bishop James Roosevelt Bayley of Newark. The spire was completed in 1879 by Joseph Trier, a Trenton contractor, as the tallest church spire in the state at that time. The tower clock was originally built by the Seth Thomas Clock Company for the Paris Exposition of 1878, where it served as the official timepiece.

=== First Cathedral of St. Mary of the Assumption ===
The Diocese of Trenton was established by Pope Leo XIII on August 2, 1881. St. Mary's Church was chosen to be the cathedral of the new diocese. Bishop Michael J. O'Farrell was consecrated by Cardinal John McCloskey at St. Patrick's Cathedral in New York City and enthroned in St. Mary's on November 17, 1881.

The gymnasium and convent were built around 1900. A new large Casavant Brothers organ was installed in the cathedral in 1948.

The diocese removed the spire from the cathedral in early 1956 due to danger of collapse. The cathedral itself and the attached rectory were destroyed in a fire on March 14, 1956. The cathedral rector, Monsignor Richard T. Crean, and two housekeepers died in the fire.

=== Second Cathedral of St. Mary of the Assumption ===
The second St. Mary's Cathedral was dedicated on March 14, 1959, by Bishop George W. Ahr at a pontifical mass celebrated by Newark Archbishop Thomas A. Boland. The attached rectory was completed at the same time.

== Architecture ==
The exterior of the second St. Mary's Cathedral is composed of Mount Airy granite. The structure is a Modern interpretation of the Romanesque style. Its bell tower rises to a height of 98 feet (30 m).

The bell tower of the first cathedral held ten bells of different sizes and tones. Warped and blackened by the fire in 1956, the diocese restored and rehung them in the bell tower of the second cathedral. The operator plays them with an electronic keyboard near the pipe organ.

The diocese also restored the clock from the first cathedral, installing it in the second cathedral. Its original mechanism, controlled by weights and pulleys, was replaced with an electrical system. The diocese also reused the bronze doors, altar rails and some of the stained glass windows in the second cathedral.

The cathedral exterior façade features statues of the Twelve Apostles.

Cathedral images

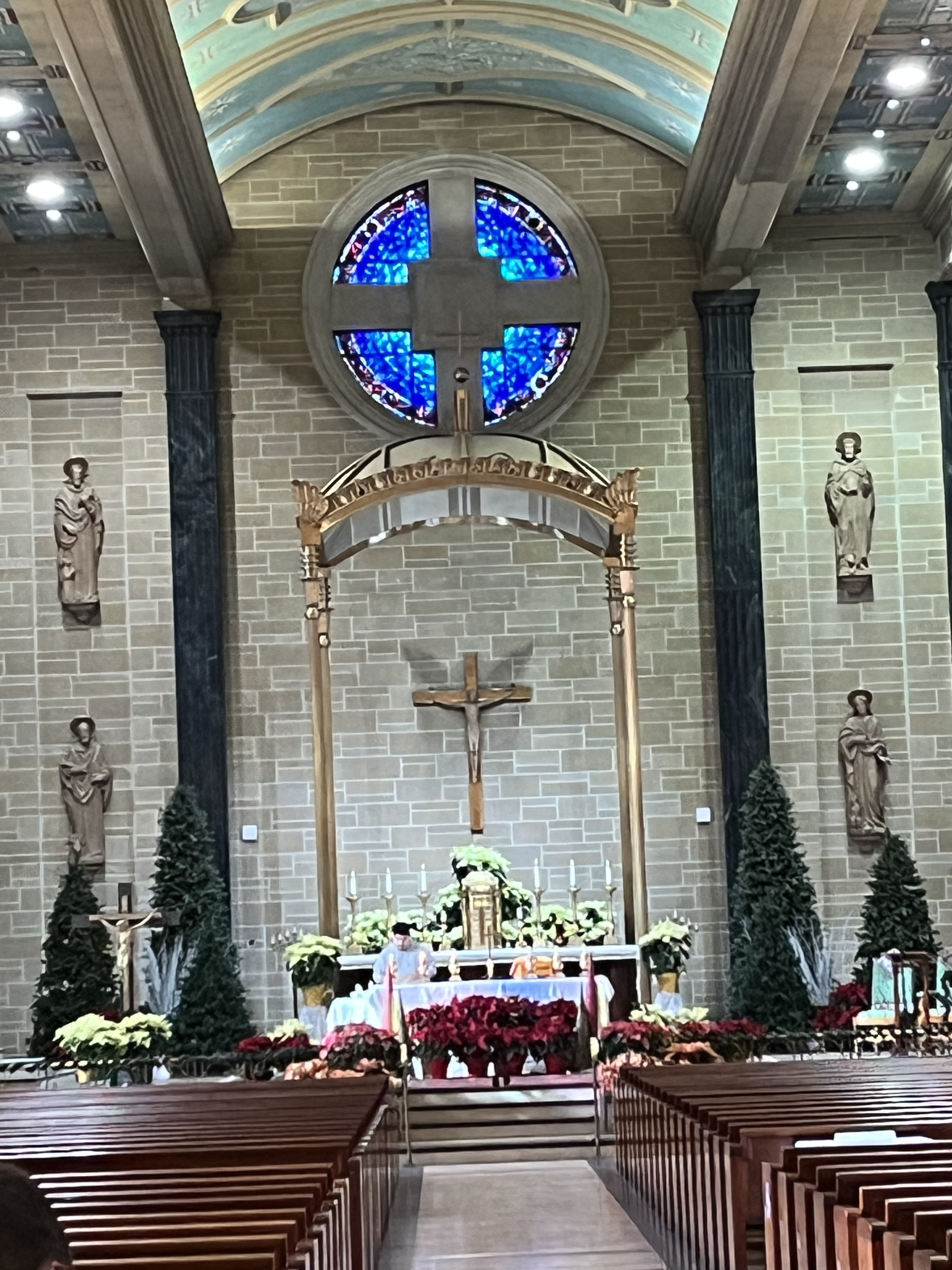
View of chancel from cathedral nave (2025)

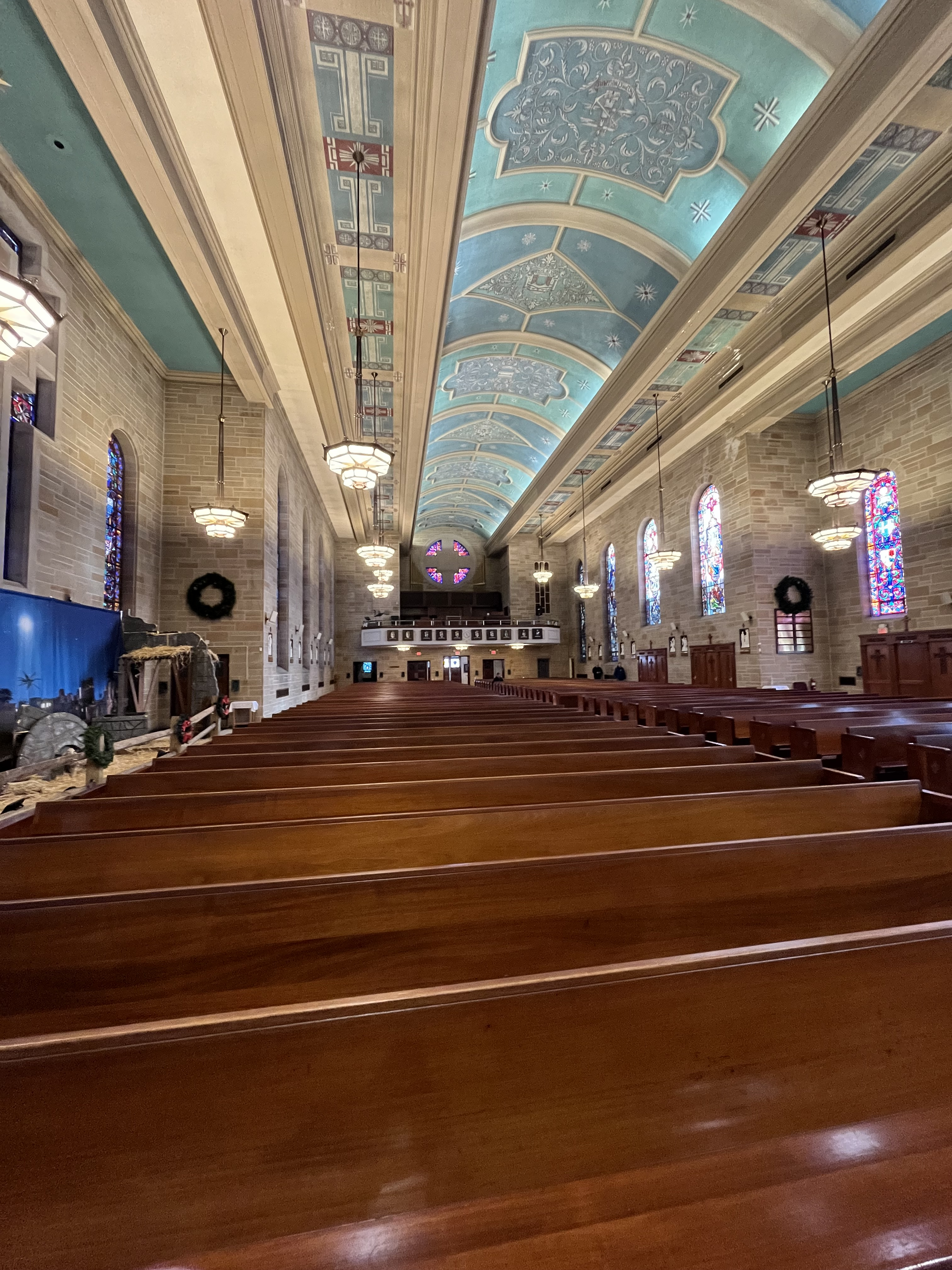
View of gallery from cathedral nave (2025)

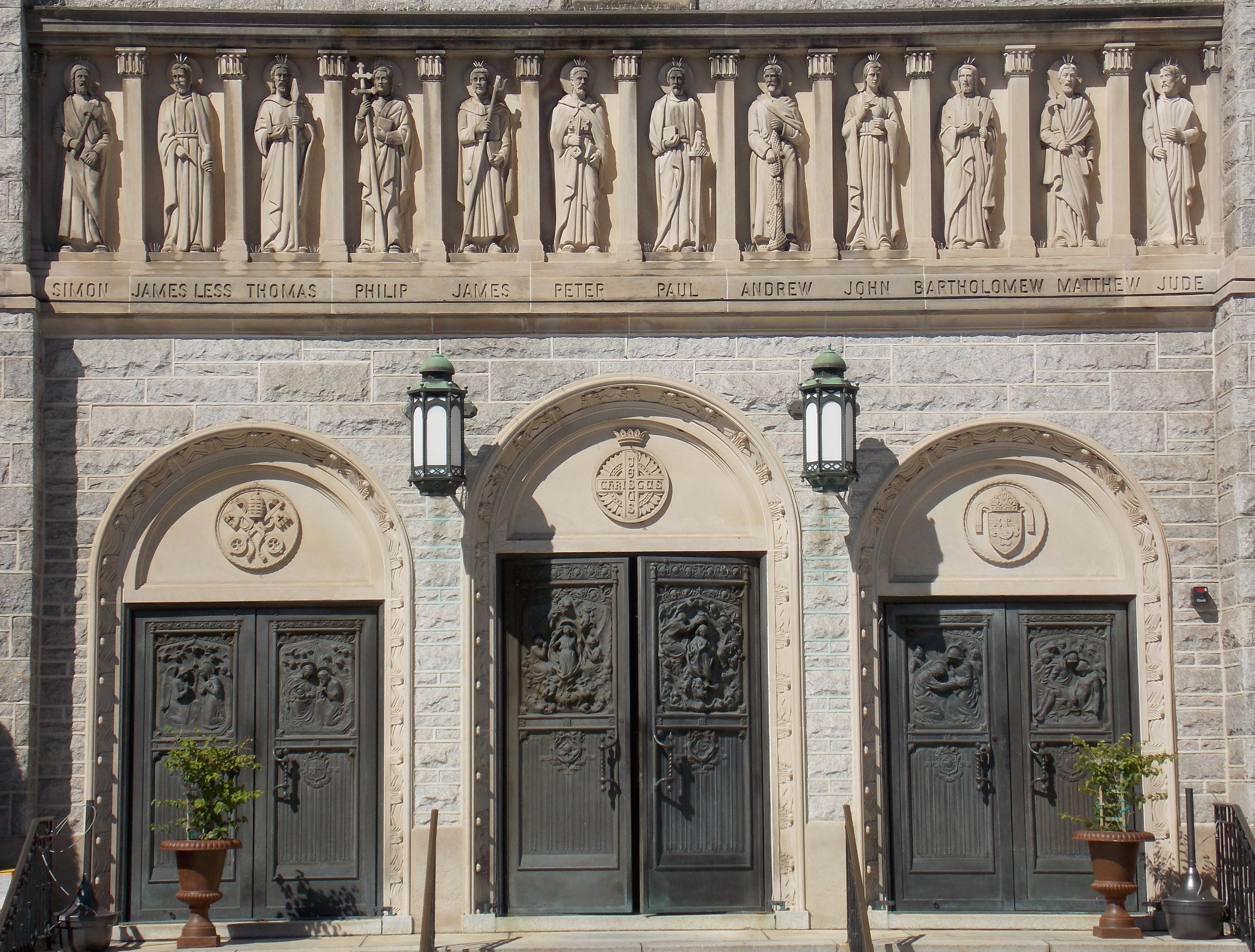
Cathedral bronze doors (2014)

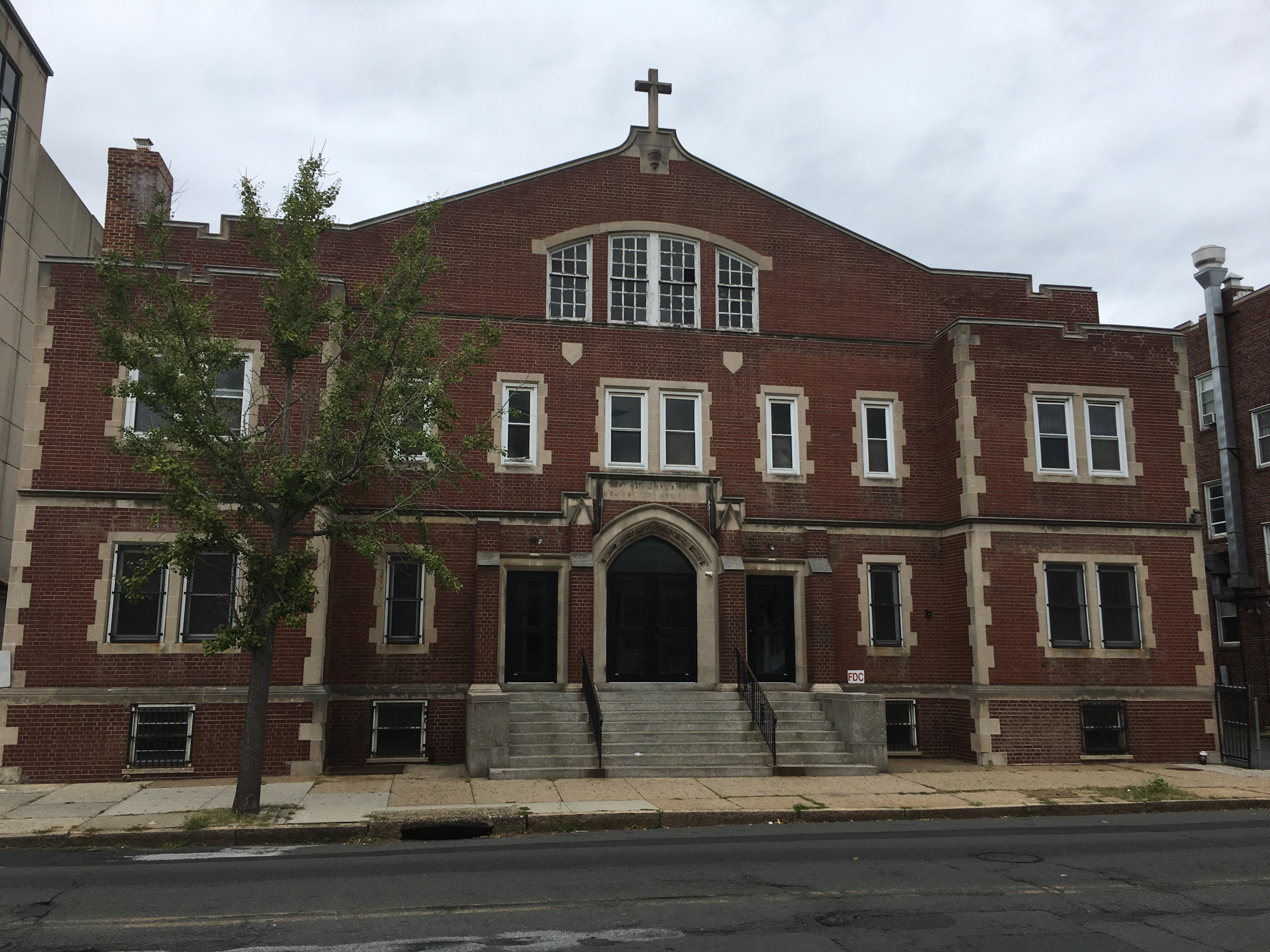
Gymnasium auditorium on cathedral campus (2016)

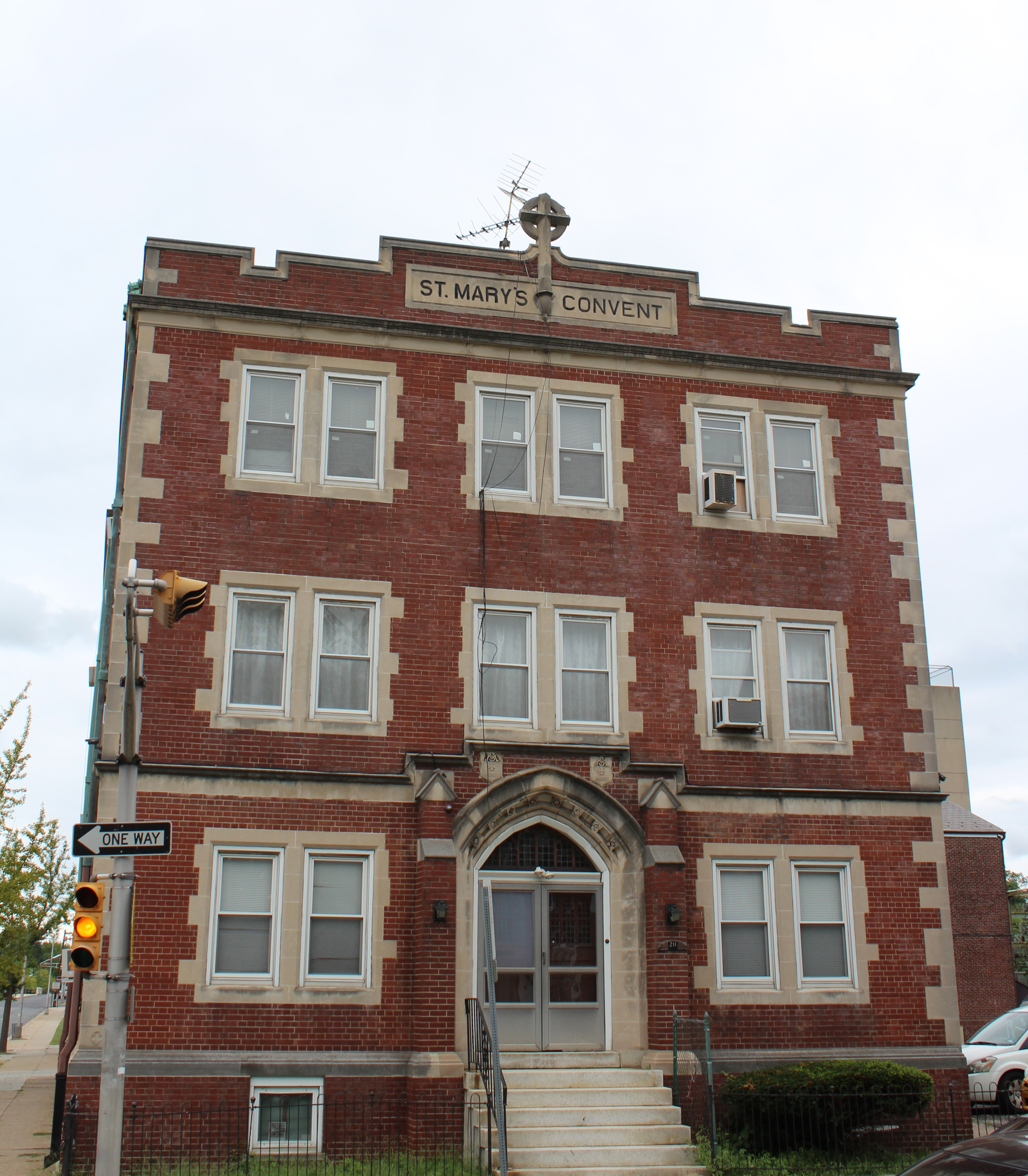
Convent on cathedral campus (2017)

== See also ==
- List of Catholic cathedrals in the United States
- List of cathedrals in the United States
