= Thomas Walsh (archbishop of Newark) =

Archbishop

His Excellency, The Most Reverend Thomas Joseph Walsh Jr.
- Archbishop of Newark
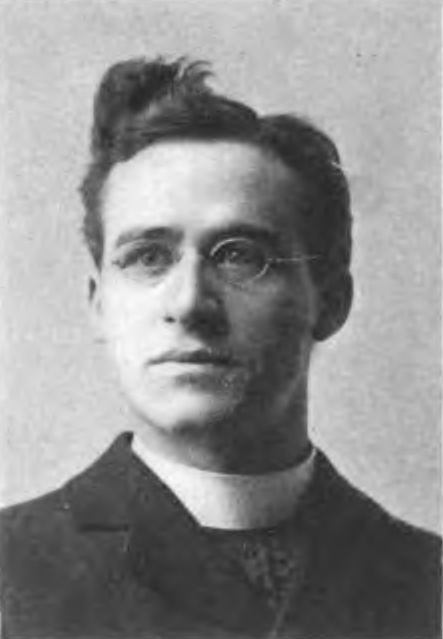
- Walsh as chancellor of the Diocese of Buffalo
- Church: Catholic
- See: Archdiocese of Newark
- Successor: Thomas Aloysius Boland
- Other posts: Bishop of Trenton; 1918 to 1928; Bishop of Newark 1928 to 1938

Orders
- Ordination: January 27, 1900 by James Edward Quigley
- Consecration: July 25, 1918 by Giovanni Bonzano

Personal details
- Born: December 6, 1873 Parker's Landing, Pennsylvania, U.S.
- Died: June 6, 1952 (aged 78)
- Education: St. Bonaventure College; Pontifical Athenaeum S. Apollinare

Thomas Joseph Walsh Jr. (December 6, 1873 – June 6, 1952) was an American prelate of the Catholic Church. He served as the first archbishop of the Archdiocese of Newark in New Jersey from 1938 until his death in 1952.

Walsh previously served as bishop of the Diocese of Newark in New Jersey from 1928 to 1938 and as bishop of the Diocese of Trenton in New Jersey from 1918 to 1928.

== Biography ==
=== Early life ===
Thomas Walsh Jr. was born on December 6, 1873, in Parker's Landing, in Armstrong County, Pennsylvania, the eldest son of Thomas and Helen (Curtin) Walsh. After attending public and parochial schools in Pennsylvania, he studied at St. Bonaventure College in Allegany, New York.

=== Priesthood ===
Walsh was ordained to the priesthood for the Diocese of Buffalo by Bishop James Edward Quigley on January 27, 1900. After his ordination, the diocese assigned Walsh as a curate at St. Joseph's Cathedral Parish in Buffalo. In June 1900, Quigley named Walsh as chancellor of the diocese and as his private secretary.

In 1907, Bishop Charles H. Colton sent Walsh to further his studies in Rome at the Pontifical Athenaeum S. Apollinare. He earned a doctorate in canon law in 1907 and a doctorate in theology in 1908.Walsh was named rector of St. Joseph's Cathedral in 1915.

=== Bishop of Trenton ===
On May 10, 1918, Walsh was appointed bishop of Trenton by Pope Benedict XV. He received his episcopal consecration on July 25, 1918, from Archbishop Giovanni Bonzano, with Bishops Dennis Dougherty and John O'Connor serving as co-consecrators.

In 1910, Pope Pius X sent five sisters of the Religious Teachers Filippini to New Jersey to work with the Italian immigrants in St. Joachim's Parish in South Trenton. In 1918, using a donation from businessman James Cox Brady, Walsh purchased the former Harvey Fisk estate in Ewing Township, New Jersey,to create a motherhouse and novitiate for the sisters.

In 1922, Walsh addressed the annual meeting of the Supreme Council of the Knights of Columbus held in Atlantic City, New Jersey.Walsh in July 1927 dedicated the new St. James High School in Red Bank, New Jersey.

=== Bishop and Archbishop of Newark ===
Following the death of Bishop O'Connor in May 1927, Walsh was named bishop of Newark on March 2, 1928. He was installed at the, as yet unfinished, Cathedral of the Sacred Heart on May 1, 1928.

The following year, Walsh established the Newark Mount Carmel Guild to help those on public assistance. In 1930, the guild set up a soup kitchen in the basement of St. Patrick's Pro-Cathedral. In 1930, Walsh acquired the "Tower Hill", the estate of Louis C. Gillespie, founder of L.C. Gillespie & Sons. He invited the Religious Teachers Filippini to expand their work to the Diocese of Newark. The sisters re-located their motherhouse to Morristown, New Jersey, and named it Villa Walsh, where they opened another girls school, Villa Walsh Academy, while continuing to operate Villa Victoria Academy in Ewing Township.

In 1931, Walsh saw the opening of a new chancery building in Newark. Prior to that, the administration of the diocese was conducted out of offices at St. John's School. In 1933, Walsh established Saint Gertrude Cemetery in Colonia, New Jersey. In 1935, Walsh attended a Eucharistic congress in Cleveland, Ohio.In 1933, the Religious Teachers Filippini established Villa Victoria Academy for girls.

Walsh raised $2 million in 25 days to build Immaculate Conception Seminary in 1936, and encouraged Seton Hall Preparatory School and Seton Hall College to seek state accreditation. In 1939, Archbishop Walsh authorized the Sisters of Saint Dominic of Caldwell, led by Mother M. Joseph Dunn, to form Caldwell College in Caldwell, NJ as a Catholic liberal arts college for women.

Upon the elevation of the Diocese of Newark to the rank of archdiocese by Pope Pius XI, Walsh was appointed its first archbishop on December 10, 1937. He received the pallium on April 27, 1938. He convened a synod in 1941. In September 1947, Walsh gave the opening convocation at the New Jersey Constitutional Convention. On May 3, 1950, the Government of Italy awarded Walsh the Star of Italian Solidarity for his work with Italian immigrants in the archdiocese.

=== Death and legacy ===
Thomas Walsh died on June 6, 1952, and was buried in the St. Patrick Cathedral crypt. Eighty-five prelates and 700 priests attended his funeral ceremony, with over 5,000 people outside the cathedral.

In 1957, the Diocese of Buffalo opened Archbishop Walsh High School in Olean, New York, in honor of Thomas Walsh..

Catholic Church titles
Preceded by James Augustine McFaul	Bishop of Trenton; 1918–1928	Succeeded by John J. McMahon
Preceded by John Joseph O'Connor	Bishop of Newark; 1928–1937	Succeeded by Promoted to Archbishop
Preceded by None	Archbishop of Newark; 1937–1952	Succeeded by Thomas Aloysius Boland
