= List of churches in the Archdiocese of Newark =

This is a list of churches in the Roman Catholic Archdiocese of Newark. The archdiocese covers northeastern New Jersey in the United States. It includes the cities of Newark and Jersey City and the counties of Bergen, and Essex, Hudson, and Union. The cathedral church of the archdiocese is the Cathedral Basilica of the Sacred Heart in Newark.

== Bergen County parishes ==
=== Fort Lee ===
| Name | Image | Location | Description/notes |
|---|---|---|---|
| Holy Trinity | | 2367 Lemoine Ave, Fort Lee | Founded in 1906 for Irish and Italian immigrants |
| Madonna | | 340 Main St, Fort Lee | Founded in 1858, it is the oldest parish in Bergen County. Its pipe organ was donated by the industrialist Andrew Carnegie. |

=== Garfield ===
| Name | Image | Location | Description/notes |
|---|---|---|---|
| Most Holy Name | | 99 Marsellus Place, Garfield | Founded in 1911 |
| Our Lady of Mount Virgin | | 188 MacArthur Ave, Garfield | Founded in 1903, the first Catholic church in Garfield. Present church dedicated in 1927 |
| St. Stanislaus Kostka | | 184 Ray St, Garfield | |

=== Hackensack ===
| Name | Image | Location | Description/notes |
|---|---|---|---|
| Holy Trinity | | 34 Maple Ave, Hackensack | Parish founded in 1861; current Romanesque Byzantine church dedicated in 1929 |
| Immaculate Conception | | 49 Vreeland Ave, Hackensack | Parish formed in 1890; church built in 1891 |
| St. Francis of Assisi | | 50 Lodi St, Hackensack | Founded in 1917 |
| St. Joseph | | 460 Hudson St, Hackensack | Church completed in 1909 |

=== Lyndhurst ===
| Name | Image | Location | Description/notes |
|---|---|---|---|
| Our Lady of Mount Carmel | | 197 Kingsland Ave, Lyndhurst | Founded as a mission in 1909, became a parish in 1966, church dedicated in 1971 |
| Sacred Heart | | 324 Ridge Rd, Lyndhurst | |
| St. Michael the Archangel | | 624 Page Ave, Lyndhurst | |

=== Paramus ===
| Name | Image | Location | Description/notes |
|---|---|---|---|
| Annunciation | | 50 W Midland Ave, Paramus | Church in dedicated 1953; built using ruins from a chapel built in 1908 by the Sisters of Charity |
| Our Lady of the Visitation | | 234 Fairview Ave, Paramus | |

=== Other Bergen County parishes ===
| Name | Image | Location | Description/notes |
|---|---|---|---|
| Guardian Angel | | 320 Franklin Tpk, Allendale | |
| St. John the Evangelist | | 29 N Washington Ave, Bergenfield | Founded in 1905, current church dedicated in 1950 |
| St. Joseph | | 115 E Fort Lee Rd, Bogota | Founded in 1913, current church dedicated in 1929 |
| Epiphany | | 247 Knox Ave, Cliffside Park | Founded as a mission in 1915, current church dedicated in 1953 |
| St. Mary | | 20 Legion Pl, Closter | Founded as a mission in 1910, current church dedicated in 1960 |
| St. Therese of Lisieux | | 120 Monroe Ave, Cresskill | Founded in 1924, current church dedicated in 1970 |
| St. Joseph | | 280 County Rd, Demarest | |
| St. Mary | | 280 Washington Ave, Dumont | Founded in 1905, current church dedicated in 1962 |
| St. Joseph | | 120 Hoboken Rd, East Rutherford | |
| Holy Rosary | | 365 Undercliff Ave, Edgewater | |
| St. Leo | | 324 Market St, Elmwood Park | |
| Assumption | | 29 Jefferson Ave, Emerson | Founded in 1905 for Italian immigrants |
| St. Cecilia | | 52 W Demarest Ave, Englewood | Founded as a mission in 1858, present church dedicated in 1912 |
| St. Anne | | 10-04 St. Anne St, Fair Lawn | Founded as a mission in 1910, became a parish in 1942, current church dedicated in 1958 |
| Our Lady of Grace | | 395 Delano St, Fairview | |
| St. John the Baptist | | 239 Anderson Ave, Fairview | |
| Most Blessed Sacrament | | 787 Franklin Lake Rd, Franklin Lakes | Founded in 1961, current church dedicated in 1981 |
| St. Catharine | | 905 S Maple Ave, Glen Rock | |
| Our Lady of Victories | | 81 Lynn St, Harrington Park | Founded in 1910, church erected in 1912 |
| Corpus Christi | | 218 Washington Pl, Hasbrouck Heights | Founded as a mission in 1897, became a parish in 1919, present church completed in 1934 |
| Sacred Heart | | 102 Park St, Haworth | Founded as a mission in 1914, became a parish in 1950, current church dedicated in 1954 |
| St. John the Baptist | | 69 Valley St, Hillsdale | |
| St. Luke | | 340 N Franklin Tpk, Ho-Ho-Kus | |
| St. John the Evangelist | | 235 Harrison St, Leonia | Founded as a mission in 1912, current church completed in 1940 |
| St. Margaret of Cortona | | 31 Chamberlain Ave, Little Ferry | Founded as a mission in 1912, became a parish in 1940, current church completed in 1962 |
| St. Francis de Sales | | 125 Union St, Lodi | Founded as a mission in 1854, church completed in 1910 |
| St. Joseph | | 40 Spring St, Lodi | Founded as a mission in 1913 |
| Immaculate Conception | | 900 Darlington Ave, Mahwah | Founded in 1928, church dedicated in 1932 |
| Immaculate Heart of Mary | | 47 Island Rd, Mahwah | Founded in 1915 for Polish immigrants. |
| Our Lady Queen of Peace | | 400 Maywood Ave, Maywood | Founded in 1946, church dedicated in 1950 |
| Nativity | | 315 Prospect St, Midland Park | |
| Ascension | | 256 Azalea Dr, New Milford | Founded in 1953, church dedicated that same year |
| St. Joseph | | 105 Harrison St, New Milford | Founded in 1903 |
| Queen of Peace | | 10 Franklin Pl, North Arlington | Founded in 1920, current church constructed in 1951 |
| St. Anthony | | 199 Walnut St, Northvale | Founded in 1890, current church dedicated in 1965 |
| Immaculate Conception | | 211 Summit St, Norwood | Founded in 1921, church dedicated that same year. |
| Our Lady of Perpetual Help | | 25 Purdue Ave, Oakland | Founded as a mission in 1960, current church dedicated in 1962 |
| St. Pius X | | 268 Old Tappan Rd, Old Tappan | Founded in 1954, church dedicated in 1955 |
| St. Michael | | 19 E Central Blvd, Palisades Park | |
| St. Nicholas | | 442 E Brinkerhoff Ave, Palisades Park | Founded in 1923 for Italian immigrants, church dedicated in 1958 |
| Our Lady of Mercy | | 2 Fremont Ave, Park Ridge | Founded in 1902, current church completed in 1961 |
| St. Paul | | 200 Wyckoff Ave, Ramsey | |
| St. Matthew | | 555 Prospect Ave, Ridgefield | |
| St. Francis of Assisi | | 114 Mt Vernon St, Ridgefield Park | Founded in the 19th century |
| Our Lady of Mount Carmel | | 1 Passaic St, Ridgewood | Founded in 1889, current church completed in 1959 |
| St. Peter the Apostle | | 445 5th Ave, River Edge | Founded in 1948 |
| Sacred Heart | | 12 Terrace Ave, Rochelle Park | Founded in 1917 |
| St. Mary | | 91 Home Ave, Rutherford | Founded in 1909, current church dedicated in 1956 |
| Korean Martyrs | | 585 Saddle River Rd, Saddle Brook | Founded in 1998 |
| St. Philip the Apostle | | 488 Saddle River Rd, Saddle Brook | |
| St. Gabriel the Archangel | | 88 E Saddle River Rd, Saddle River | Founded in 1953. |
| St. Anastasia | | 1095 Teaneck Rd, Teaneck | Founded as a mission in 1908, became a parish in 1931, current church dedicated in 1932 |
| Our Lady of Mount Carmel | | 10 County Rd, Tenafly | Founded in 1873, current church completed in 1952 |
| Church of the Presentation | | 271 W Saddle River Rd, Upper Saddle River | |
| Most Sacred Heart of Jesus | | 127 Paterson Ave, Wallington | Founded in 1942, current church dedicate in 1955 |
| Our Lady of Good Counsel | | 668 Ridgewood Rd, Washington Twp | Founded in 1959 |
| St. Andrew | | 120 Washington Ave, Westwood | Founded in 1889, current church dedicated in 1964 |
| Assumption of Our Blessed Lady | | 143 1st St, Wood-Ridge | Founded by the Franciscans in 1928, current church dedicated in 1958 |
| Our Lady Mother of the Church | | 209 Woodcliff Ave, Woodcliff Lake | |
| St. Elizabeth of Hungary | | 700 Wyckoff Ave, Wyckoff | Founded in 1902, current church dedicated in 1954 |

== Essex County parishes ==
=== Bloomfield ===
| Name | Image | Location | Description/notes |
|---|---|---|---|
| Sacred Heart | | 76 Broad St, Bloomfield | |
| St. Thomas the Apostle | | 60 Byrd Ave, Bloomfield | Founded in 1939, current church dedicated in 1960 |
| St. Valentine | | 125 N Spring St, Bloomfield | Founded in 1899 for Polish immigrants, church dedicated that same year |

=== Irvington ===
| Name | Image | Location | Description/notes |
|---|---|---|---|
| Good Shepherd | | 954 Stuyvesant Ave, Irvington | Founded in 2005 with the merger of Immaculate Heart of Mary and St. Paul Parishes. |
| Sacred Heart of Jesus | | 537 Grove St, Irvington | |
| St. Leo | | 103 Myrtle Ave, Irvington | Founded in 1878 |

=== Montclair ===
| Name | Image | Location | Description/notes |
|---|---|---|---|
| St. Peter Claver | | 56 Elmwood Ave, Montclair | Founded as a mission for African-Americans in 1931, church completed in 1939, became a parish in 1973 |
| Immaculate Conception Church / St. Teresa of Calcutta | | 1 Munn Street, Montclair | |
| St. Cassian | | 187 Bellevue Ave, Montclair | Founded in 1895 as a mission, current church dedicated in 1995 |

=== Newark ===
| Name | Image | Location | Description/notes |
|---|---|---|---|
| St. Anthony | | 409 N 2nd St, East Newark | Now part of Holy Cross Parish |
| Blessed Sacrament/St. Charles Borromeo | | 15 Van Ness Pl, Newark | Blessed Sacrament founded in 1905 and St. Charles Borromeo in 1910. Parishes merged in 1999. |
| Cathedral Basilica of the Sacred Heart | | 89 Ridge St, Newark | |
| Holy Trinity - Epiphany | | 207 Adams St, Newark | Holy Trinity Parish founded in 1902 for Lithuanian immigrants, merged with Epiphany Parish in 2002 |
| Immaculate Conception | | 370-406 Woodside Ave, Newark | |
| Immaculate Heart of Mary | | 202 Lafayette St, Newark | Constructed as a Baptist church in 1858, became St. Joseph Catholic Church in 1928. Renamed Immaculate Heart of Mary in 1950s |
| Our Lady of Fatima | | 82 Congress St, Newark | Founded in 1958 for Portuguese immigrants |
| Our Lady of Good Counsel | | 654 Summer Ave, Newark | Merged with Immaculate Conception Parish in 2005 |
| Our Lady of Mount Carmel | | 259 Oliver St, Newark | Founded in 1894, current church completed in 1955 |
| Pro-Cathedral of St. Patrick | | 91 Washington St, Newark | |
| St. Aloysius | | 66 Fleming Ave, Newark | Founded in 1879, church dedicated in 1881 |
| St. Anthony | | 750 N 7th St, Newark | |
| St. Antoninus | | 337 S Orange Ave, Newark | Founded by the Dominicans in 1875, church dedicated in 1940 |
| St. Augustine | | 170 Sussex Ave, Newark | Founded in 1874 for German immigrants, current church dedicated in 1893 |
| St. Benedict | | 65 Barbara St, Newark | Founded in 1857 for German Catholics, current church dedicated in 1882 |
| St. Casimir | | 91 Pulaski St, Newark | Founded in 1908 for Polish immigrants, church dedicated in 1920 |
| St. Columba | | 25 Thomas St, Newark | Founded in 1871, current church dedicated in 1898 |
| St. Francis Xavier | | 243 Abington Ave W, Newark | |
| St. James | | 142 Jefferson St, Newark | |
| St. John | | 22 Mulberry St, Newark | |
| St. Lucy | | 19-27 Ruggiero Plaza, Newark | Founded in 1891 for Italian immigrants, church completed in 1926 |
| St. Mary's Abbey Church | | 528 Martin Luther King Jr Blvd, Newark | Founded in 1842 for German immigrants, attacked by Know-Nothing mob in 1854, present church completed in 1857. Staffed by Benedictines of Newark Abbey since 1857. |
| St. Michael | | 172 Broadway, Newark | |
| St. Rose of Lima | | 11 Gray St, Newark | Founded in 1888 |
| St. Stanislaus Bishop & Martyr | | 146 Irvine Turner Blvd, Newark | Founded in 1889, church completed in 1901 |
| Transfiguration | | 103 16th Ave, Newark | Founded in 2005 with the merger of St. Ann and St. Rocco Parishes |

=== Nutley ===
| Name | Image | Location | Description/notes |
|---|---|---|---|
| Holy Family | | 28 Brookline Ave, Nutley | |
| Our Lady of Mount Carmel | | 120 Prospect St, Nutley | Founded in 1925 for Polish immigrants, current church completed in 1949 |
| St. Mary | | 17 Msg. Owens Pl, Nutley | Founded in 1872, church completed in 1876 |

=== The Oranges ===
| Name | Image | Location | Description/notes |
|---|---|---|---|
| Holy Name of Jesus | | 184 Midland Ave, East Orange | Founded in 1910, present church dedicated in 1933 |
| Holy Spirit - Our Lady Help of Christians | | 17 N Clinton St, East Orange | Holy Spirit founded in 1931 and Our Lady in 1882. Parishes merged in 1983 |
| Our Lady of Lourdes | | 1 Eagle Rock Ave, West Orange | Founded in 1914, current church completed in 1964 |
| Our Lady of Mount Carmel | | 103 S Center St, Orange | Founded in 1902 for Italian immigrants, church dedicated in 1933 |
| Our Lady of Sorrows | | 217 Prospect St, South Orange | Founded in the 1880s, current church dedicated in 1930 |
| Our Lady of the Valley | | 510 Valley St, Orange | Founded as a mission in 1873, current church dedicated in 1911 |
| St. Anthony of Padua Oratory | | 1360 Pleasant Valley Way, West Orange | Founded in 2007, operated by the Institute of Christ the King |
| St. John | | 94 Ridge St, Orange | |
| St. Joseph | | 110 Telford St, East Orange | |
| St. Joseph | | 44 Benvenue Ave, West Orange | Founded in 1931, church dedicated in 1932 |

=== Other Essex County parishes ===
| Name | Image | Location | Description/notes |
|---|---|---|---|
| Our Lady of the Lake | | 22 Lakeside Ave, Verona | Founded in 1923, current church dedicated in 1964 |
| St. Peter | | 155 William St, Belleville | Founded as a mission in 1837, church rededicated after fire in 1978 |
| St. Aloysius | | 219 Bloomfield Ave, Caldwell | Founded in 1892 |
| St. Catherine of Siena | | 339 Pompton Ave, Cedar Grove | Founded in 1951, church dedicated in 1952 |
| St. Thomas More | | 210 Horseneck Rd, Fairfield | Founded in 1962, current church completed in 1965 |

== Hudson County parishes ==
=== Bayonne ===
| Name | Image | Location | Description/notes |
|---|---|---|---|
| Our Lady of Mt. Carmel | | 39 E 22nd St, Bayonne | Romanesque Revival church dedicated in 1899; the church and supporting buildings form the Mount Carmel Historic District |
| St. Henry | | 82 W 29th St, Bayonne | Parish formed in 1889; current English Gothic church completed in 1915 |
| St. Mary, Star of the Sea | | 326 Ave C, Bayonne | Church dedicated in 1881; now part of Blessed Miriam Teresa Demjanovich Parish |
| St. Vincent de Paul | | 979 Ave C, Bayonne | Lombardy Romanesque church completed in 1930; listed on the NRHP |

=== Hoboken ===
| Name | Image | Location | Description/notes |
|---|---|---|---|
| Our Lady of Grace and St. Joseph | | 400 Willow Ave, Hoboken | Our Lady of Grace founded in 1851 and St Joseph in 1874; current church dedicated in 1878. Parishes merged in 2008 |
| St. Ann | | 704 Jefferson St, Hoboken | Founded in 1900 for Italian immigrants, Romanesque church completed in 1927 |
| St. Francis | | 308 Jefferson St, Hoboken | Founded in 1888 for Italian immigrants,church dedicated in 1889; Frank Sinatra baptized there in 1916 |
| Ss. Peter and Paul | | 404 Hudson St, Hoboken | Founded in 1889 for German immigrants; current church dedicated in 1929 |

=== Jersey City ===
| Name | Image | Location | Description/notes |
|---|---|---|---|
| Christ the King | | 768 Ocean Ave, Jersey City | Founded in 1930, the first African-American parish in the archdiocese |
| Holy Rosary | | 344 6th St, Jersey City | |
| Our Lady of Czestochowa | | 120 Sussex St, Jersey City | Church constructed for Protestant congregation in 1870, became Our Lady of Czestochowa Catholic Church for Polish immigrants in 1905 |
| Our Lady of Mercy | | 40 Sullivan Dr, Jersey City | Founded in 1963, church dedicated in 1974 |
| Our Lady of Mount Carmel | | 99 Broadway, Jersey City | Founded in 1905 for Italian immigrants |
| Our Lady of Sorrows | | 93-95 Clerk St, Jersey City | Founded as a mission in 1913, current church dedicated in 1935 |
| Our Lady of Victories | | 2217 Kennedy Blvd, Jersey City | Founded in 1917 |
| Sacred Heart | | 183 Bayview Ave, Greenville, Jersey City | Spanish Gothic and Moorish style church completed in 1924 |
| St. Aedan | | 800 Bergen Ave, Jersey City | Church dedicated in 1931, serves as the Saint Peter's University Church and a local parish church |
| St. Aloysius | | 691 West Side Ave, Jersey City | Parish established in 1897; French Renaissance style church and bell tower dedicated in 1908 |
| St. Ann (Polish) | | 291 St Paul Ave, Jersey City | |
| St. Anne of the Heights | | 3545 Kennedy Blvd, Jersey City | Founded as a mission in 1903, became a parish in 1904, church completed in 1927 |
| St. Anthony of Padua | | 457 Monmouth St, Jersey City | Gothic church built in 1892, listed on NRHP |
| St. John the Baptist | | 3026 Kennedy Blvd, Jersey City | Established in 1884; current Romanesque style church completed in 1897 |
| St. Joseph | | 511 Pavonia Ave, Jersey City | Founded in 1856 for Irish immigrants, church dedicated in 1873 |
| St. Mary of the Immaculate Conception | | 219 3rd St, Jersey City | Founded in 1861, second oldest parish in Jersey City, church dedicated in 1903. Merged into Resurrection Parish in 1997, became independent again in 2014 |
| St. Michael | | 252 9th St, Jersey City | Founded in 1867 for Irish immigrants. Merged into Resurrection Parish in 1997, became independent again in 2010 |
| St. Nicholas | | 122 Ferry St, Jersey City | |
| St. Patrick | | 492 Bramhall Ave, Jersey City | Church dedicated in 1877 |
| St. Paul the Apostle | | 14 Greenville Ave, Jersey City | |
| St. Paul of the Cross | | 156 Hancock Ave, Jersey City | Founded in 1869 by the Passionist Fathers. |

=== Kearny ===
| Name | Image | Location | Description/notes |
|---|---|---|---|
| Our Lady of Sorrows | | 136 Davis Ave, Kearny | Founded in 1915 for Lithuanian immigrants |
| St. Cecilia | | 120 Kearny Ave, Kearny | Founded in 1893, church dedicated that same year |
| St. Stephen | | 141 Washington Ave, Kearny | Founded in 1904, church dedicated in 1939 |

=== North Bergen ===
| Name | Image | Location | Description/notes |
|---|---|---|---|
| Our Lady of Fatima | | 8016 Kennedy Blvd, North Bergen | |
| Sacred Heart | | 9034 Barr Pl, North Bergen | Founded in 1917 |

=== Union City ===
| Name | Image | Location | Description/notes |
|---|---|---|---|
| Holy Family | | 530 35th St, Union City | |
| St. Anthony of Padua | | 615 8th St, Union City | |
| St. Augustine | | 3900 New York Ave, Union City | Founded in 1886 |
| Ss. Joseph and Michael | | 1314 Central Ave, Union City | |
| St. Rocco - St. Brigid | | 4206 Kennedy Blvd, Union City | St. Rocco founded by the Pallottine Fathers in 1912 for Italian immigrants |

=== Other Hudson County parishes ===
| Name | Image | Location | Description/notes |
|---|---|---|---|
| Our Lady of Fatima | | 8011 Kennedy Blvd, North Bergen | Founded in 1963 |
| St. Augustine | | 3900 New York Ave, North Bergen | |

== Union County parishes ==
=== Elizabeth ===
| Name | Image | Location | Description/notes |
|---|---|---|---|
| Blessed Sacrament | | 1096 North Ave, Elizabeth | Founded in 1922 |
| Immaculate Conception | | 417 Union Ave, Elizabeth | Parish established in 1910 |
| Our Lady of Fatima | | 403 Spring St, Elizabeth | Founded in 1973 for Portuguese immigrants |
| Our Lady of the Most Holy Rosary and St. Michael | | 52 Smith St, Elizabeth | St. Michael founded in 1852 and Most Holy Rosary in 1886. Merged in 1985 |
| St. Adalbert | | 250 E Jersey St, Elizabeth | Parish established in 1905; church dedicated in 1906 |
| St. Anthony of Padua | | 853 3rd Ave, Elizabeth | Founded in 1892, it is the oldest Polish parish in New Jersey. |
| St. Genevieve | | 200 Monmouth Rd, Elizabeth | Parish founded as a mission 1920; current church built in 1930 |
| St. Hedwig | | 717 Polonia Ave, Elizabeth | Founded in 1925 |
| St. Mary of the Assumption | | 155 Washington Ave, Elizabeth | Founded in 1844, the first Catholic church in Elizabeth. Current church completed in 1950 |
| Immaculate Heart of Mary and St. Patrick | | 215 Court St, Elizabeth | St. Patrick founded in 1858 and Immaculate Heart of Mary in 1947. Merged in 2003 |
| Ss. Peter and Paul | | 211 Ripley Pl, Elizabeth | Founded by Lithuanians; built in early 1900s; merged into one parish with St. Adalbert |

=== Linden ===
| Name | Image | Location | Description/notes |
|---|---|---|---|
| Holy Family | | 210 Monroe St, Linden | Founded in 1955 |
| St. Elizabeth of Hungary | | 220 E Blanke St, Linden | |
| St. John the Apostle | | 1805 Penbrook Ter, Linden | |
| St. Theresa of the Child Jesus | | 131 E Edgar Rd, Linden | Parish established in 1925; new church completed in 1954 |

=== Plainfield ===
| Name | Image | Location | Description/notes |
|---|---|---|---|
| St. Bernard of Clairvaux & St. Stanislaus Kostka | | 368 Sumner Ave, Plainfield | St. Bernard founded as mission in 1915 and St. Stanislaus in 1920. Merged in 2005 |
| St. Mary | | 516 W 6th St, Plainfield | Established in 1851 |

=== Summit ===
| Name | Image | Location | Description/notes |
|---|---|---|---|
| Dominican Monastery of Our Lady of the Rosary | | 543 Springfield Ave, Summit | Established in 1919 |
| St. Teresa of Avila | | 301 Morris Ave, Summit | Founded as a mission in 1863, became a parish in 1874, current church dedicated in 1925 |

=== Westfield ===
| Name | Image | Location | Description/notes |
|---|---|---|---|
| Holy Trinity | | 315 1st St, Westfield | Founded in 1872, current church dedicated in 1922 |
| St. Helen | | 1600 Rahway Ave, Westfield | Founded in 1968, church dedicated in 1972 |

=== Other Union County parishes ===
| Name | Image | Location | Description/notes |
|---|---|---|---|
| Little Flower | | 290 Plainfield Ave, Berkeley Heights | Founded as a mission for Italian immigrants in 1930, church dedicated that same year |
| St. Agnes | | 332 Madison Hill Rd, Clark | Founded in 1961, church dedicated in 1964 |
| St. Michael | | 40 Alden St, Cranford | Founded in the late 19th century, current church dedicated in 1951 |
| St. Catherine of Siena | | 1000 N Broad St, Hillside | Founded in 1904; current church built in 1920s |

=== Closed churches ===
| Name | Image | Location | Description/notes |
|---|---|---|---|
| Resurrection | | 209 3rd St, Jersey City | Created in 1997 with the merger of five parishes. Dissolved in 2014, with St. Michael and St. Mary Parishes becoming independent |
| Sacred Heart | | Vailsburg, Newark | Closed in 2010 |
| St. Joseph | | 233 W Market St, Newark | Constructed in 1871 |
| St. Michael the Archangel | | Union City | |
| St. Rocco | | 212 Hunterdon St, Newark | Founded in 1899, church dedicated in 1890 |
| St. Thomas Aquinas | | 40 Ludlow St, Newark | Founded in 1957, closed in 2024 |
