= Saints Cyril and Methodius (disambiguation) =

Saints Cyril and Methodius were brothers from Thessalonica who were Christian missionaries among the Slavs.

Saints Cyril and Methodius may also refer to:

- Order of Saints Cyril and Methodius
- Saints Cyril and Methodius Cathedral, Prague
- SS. Cyril and Methodius Parish (disambiguation)
- Ss Cyril and Methodius University (disambiguation)
- SS. Cyril and Methodius in Lemont
- Ss. Cyril and Methodius University of Skopje
- SS. Cyril and Methodius National Library
- Sts. Cyril and Methodius Church (disambiguation)
- SS. Cyril and Methodius Seminary
- Ss. Cyril and Methodius School
- Byzantine Catholic Seminary of SS. Cyril and Methodius
- Croatian Franciscan Province of Saints Cyril and Methodius
