= Sts. Cyril and Methodius Church =

Sts. Cyril and Methodius Church may refer to

In Bulgaria:

- Church of Sts. Cyril and Methodius, Burgas

In Canada:

- Sts. Cyril and Methodius Ukrainian Catholic Church (St. Catharines)

In Croatia:

- Church of Saints Cyril and Methodius, Vinkovci
- Greek Catholic Co-cathedral of Saints Cyril and Methodius, Zagreb

In Czechia:

- Church of Saints Cyril and Methodius (Karlín)
- Saints Cyril and Methodius Cathedral (Prague)

In North Macedonia:

- Saint Cyril and Methodius Church (Petralinci)

In Poland:

- Sts. Cyril and Methodius Church (Wrocław)

In Slovenia:

- Sts. Cyril and Methodius Church (Ljubljana)

In the United States (by state):

- Sts. Cyril and Methodius Church (Bridgeport, Connecticut)
- Sts. Cyril and Methodius Church (Hartford, Connecticut)
- Saints Cyril and Methodius Church (Chicago)
- SS. Cyril and Methodius in Lemont, Illinois
- St. Cyril and St. Methodius Church (Lisbon Falls, Maine)
- Sts. Cyril & Methody Macedonian Orthodox Church, Blasdell, New York
- Church of Sts. Cyril & Methodius and St. Raphael (New York City)
- Saints Kyril & Metodi Bulgarian Eastern Orthodox Diocesan Cathedral (New York City)
- Sts. Cyril and Methodius Church (Shiner, Texas), listed in the National Register of Historic Places listings in Lavaca County, Texas
- Saints Cyril and Methodius Catholic Church and Rectory (Rock Springs, Wyoming)
