= Saint Mary Church (Norwalk, Connecticut) =

Coordinates: 41°06′53.37″N 73°24′52.26″W

St. Mary Church
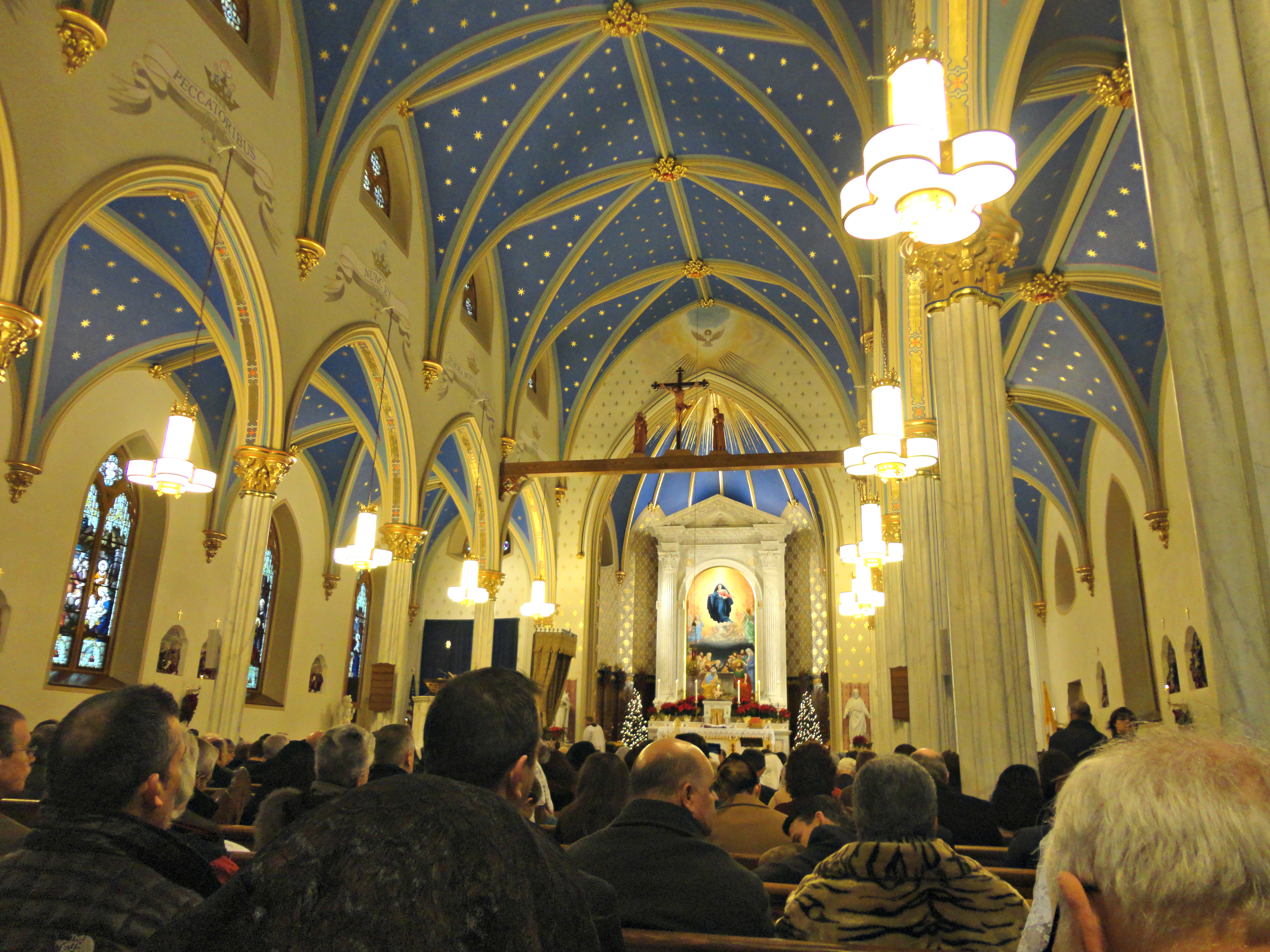
- Interior of St.Mary Norwalk
- St. Mary Church
- Location: 669 West Avenue; Norwalk, Connecticut
- Country: United States
- Denomination: Roman Catholic
- Website: Official website

History
- Founded: 1848

Architecture
- Architect(s): James Murphy (for 1870s church); Duncan Stroik (for 2010 renovation)

Administration
- Province: Hartford
- Diocese: Bridgeport

Clergy
- Bishop: Most Rev. Frank J. Caggiano
- Pastor: Fr. John Ringley

St. Mary Church is a Catholic parish in Norwalk, Connecticut, part of the Diocese of Bridgeport. As the first Catholic Church in Norwalk, from which three other parishes developed, St. Mary's is considered the Mother Church of Norwalk.

== History ==
The first Mass celebrated in Norwalk was said in 1833 by Rev. James McDermot of New Haven, in the front room of Michael Cooney's house, near the dock on the east side of Water Street. McDermot would visit Norwalk semi-annually until 1837, when he was transferred to Lowell. The congregation at that time numbered about twenty-five persons. McDermot was followed by Rev. James Smyth, also of New Haven, who continue to say Mass at Clooney's, as well as, in the basement of George F. Belden's tin store.

In 1844, Norwalk became a mission of Bridgeport. Rev. Michael Lynch said Mass at the home of Brian Mahoney at the foot of Mill Hill on Wall street. By the summer, he was using a large tenement house on River Street as it could better accommodate the seventy-five people in attendance. In 1848, the Catholic community in Norwalk petitioned Bishop William Tyler of the Diocese of Hartford for a resident priest. Tyler visited Norwalk and said Mass at Marine Hall. The bishop was sufficiently impressed that he appointed Rev. John Brady to Norwalk with Stamford and some neighboring places as missions. Construction of the New York and New Haven Railroad drew a good number of Catholic laborers, and Brady secured permission to use the Town Hall for religious services. As Brady was also responsible for Danbury, Newtown, and Stamford, he made it to Norwalk about once a month.

Brady set about to establish a proper church. Among the first to subscribe to contributions were the influential Rev. Dr. Mead of St. Paul's Episcopal church and the Congregationalist minister, Dr. Hall. He purchased property on Chapel Street, opposite Academy Street, and its first church, a modest wooden frame structure 36 by 40 feet, was dedicated in 1851 by Bishop Bernard O'Reilly. Brady resided on the "Cove Road" near Stamford and said Mass at Norwalk semi-monthly. In 1852, a Rev. Kelly was assigned to Norwalk as assistant and Mass was then celebrated every Sunday. Brady was transferred to Provience because of ill health and was succeeded in 1853 by Rev. E.C. Cooney, a great temperance man. Rev. Hugh O'Reilly became pastor the following year and purchased a residence on Chapel Street known as the "Eldridge Brown House". O'Reilly's tenure saw the rise of the Know Nothings, who expressed their hostility by setting fire to the church, and on another occasion sawing off the gilded cross atop the church.

Rev. Peter Smith (1862–1875) set about to build the current church. He broke ground for it in 1867, and the basement chapel was dedicated about a year later. Here the growing Irish community could have Mass while they raised money to build the church up above. Upon completion of the basement, the old church was sold and the bodies in the old graveyard reinterred in the new cemetery. It was not until 1870 that the upper church was dedicated. Worn out by his labors, Smith died in 1875 and is buried in historical St. Mary Cemetery of Norwalk. In 1890 the marble and decoration of the church was completed by Pastor Fr. Slocum.

The parish of St. Mary was split several times to form new parishes, as Norwalk's Catholic population grew. The parish of Saint Joseph was formed in 1895. The parish of St. Matthew was split off in 1958, the parish of St. Jerome was split off in 1960, and the parish of St. Philip was created in 1964.

== Architecture ==
The Gothic Revival-style church was built in the early 1870s to the design of the noted church architect James Murphy. The church's facade ornamentation is alternate blocks of light and dark cut granite. The tower, narrowing in tiers by means of buttress work, and the varied pedimenting that leads up to the most spire, combining to produce a harmonious front effect. The rose-window consists of an octofoil opening surrounded by eight smaller lights; while above this symmetrical arrangement are three lancets. The church interior was Gothic, with pillars, finished in a combination of fluting and scalloping, capped in flower and leaf work.

Renovation work was done in 1931 and a side door added on the south side. In 1961 the altar rail was removed and the marble was covered over with carpet. All three marble altars were reduced in size, and browns and beige covered the details of earlier painting.

The church was subsequently extensively remodeled under the direction of Duncan Stroik, professor of architecture at the University of Notre Dame. The marble side altars were reconstructed. An altarpiece by Leonard Porter Studios depicts the Assumption, framed by a reredos. John Canning Studios did the decorative painting of stars on the ceiling and stenciling.

== Austin pipe organ ==
The church's organ was built in 1994 by the Austin Organ Company of Hartford, CT, Opus 2756, 2 manuals and pedal, 24 ranks.
