= St. Paul Church (Connecticut) =

St. Paul's Church
- St. Paul's Church
- 41.05349°N 73.68853°W
- Location: 84 Sherwood Avenue; Greenwich, Connecticut
- Country: United States
- Denomination: Roman Catholic

Architecture
- Architect(s): Joseph A. Jackson first church Joseph Chimblo 1969 church

Administration
- Province: Hartford
- Diocese: Bridgeport

Clergy
- Bishop: Most Rev. Frank Joseph Caggiano
- Priest: Rev. Michael J. V. Clark

St. Paul's is a Roman Catholic church in the Glenville section of Greenwich, Connecticut, part of the Diocese of Bridgeport. This is one of the only parishes in Connecticut that also serve parishioners who live in New York.

== History ==
The parish was founded in 1902. The original church was designed by the well-known church architect Joseph A. Jackson of New Haven and New York. The contractor, Max A. Dunschmidt, was locally famous at the time for his many building projects. The Shingle-style Gothic building had a clerestory 43 feet by 68 feet, a brick basement, and seating capacity for 150. The church was ready for use in October 1902.

In 1942 the church acquired a two-manual pipe organ, opus 3145, from the Estey Organ Company of Brattleboro, Vermont. The fate of this instrument is unknown.

By 1960 the church had become too small for its growing congregation and, although the earlier building was highly regarded, it was decided that a new church was needed. Plans for the church were put on hold, however, until a new school building was completed. The large circular church, a bit of a local landmark, was finally begun in 1969. The plans were supplied by local architect Joseph Chimblo.

Although Jackson's St. Paul Church of 1902 has been demolished, it is still mentioned frequently in the citation for the Greenville Historic District.
