= Saint Joseph Church (Norwalk, Connecticut) =

Coordinates: 41°05′43.35″N 73°25′07.43″W

St. Joseph Church
- St. Joseph Church
- Location: 85 South Main Street; South Norwalk, Connecticut
- Country: United States
- Denomination: Roman Catholic

Architecture
- Architect: Joseph A. Jackson

Administration
- Province: Hartford
- Diocese: Bridgeport
- Parish: Saint Joseph Church

Clergy
- Bishop: Most Rev. Frank Joseph Caggiano
- Vicar: Father G. Frantz Desruisseax
- Pastor: Father Edicson Orozco

St. Joseph is a Roman Catholic church in South Norwalk, Connecticut, part of the Diocese of Bridgeport.

== History ==
Saint Joseph's Church was founded in 1895, from the southern portion of Saint Mary's. The first pastor was Rev. John Winters. Winters rented the Music Hall on South Main Street for services. The congregation was Irish, Hungarian, and Italian.

The church's architecture is Gothic Revival, designed by architect Joseph A. Jackson. The cornerstone was laid April 4, 1897.

== Present day ==
At St. Joseph Church in South Norwalk, Mass is conducted in English, Spanish, and French Creole.
