= St. Michael the Archangel Parish, Derby =

Coordinates: 41°19′07″N 73°04′51″W

St. Michael the Archangel Parish
- St. Michael the Archangel Parish
- Location: 75 Derby Avenue; Derby, Connecticut
- Country: United States
- Denomination: Roman Catholic
- Website: Parish website

History
- Founded: July 15, 1905
- Founder: Polish immigrants
- Dedication: St. Michael the Archangel
- Dedicated: July 4, 1907

Administration
- Division: Vicariate: Waterbury
- Province: Hartford
- Archdiocese: Hartford
- Parish: Congregation of the Mission

Clergy
- Archbishop: Most Rev. Leonard Paul Blair, S.T.D.
- Bishop(s): Most Rev. Christie Macaluso, D.D.
- Vicar: Fr. Marek Sobczak C.M.
- Pastor(s): Fr. A. Rafal Kopystynski, C.M.

St. Michael the Archangel Parish - designated for Polish immigrants in Derby, Connecticut, United States.

Founded in 1905. It is one of the Polish-American Roman Catholic parishes in New England in the Archdiocese of Hartford.

== History ==
Bishop of Hartford Michael Tierney established St. Michael the Archangel Parish on July 15, 1905. Fr. Stanislaus Konieczny C.M., of the Vincentian Fathers, was appointed founding pastor. Durrschmidt Hall on lower Main St. was rented for Masses, the first of which was celebrated on August 20, 1905. A new church was dedicated on July 4, 1907, by Fr. John Synnott, who represented Bishop of Hartford Michael Tierney. The architect was Joseph A. Jackson of Waterbury CT.

== Bibliography ==
- The 150th Anniversary of Polish-American Pastoral Ministry. Webster, Massachusetts: St. Joseph Basilica. September 11, 2005.
- The Official Catholic Directory in USA
