= Joseph A. Jackson =

American architect (1861–1940)

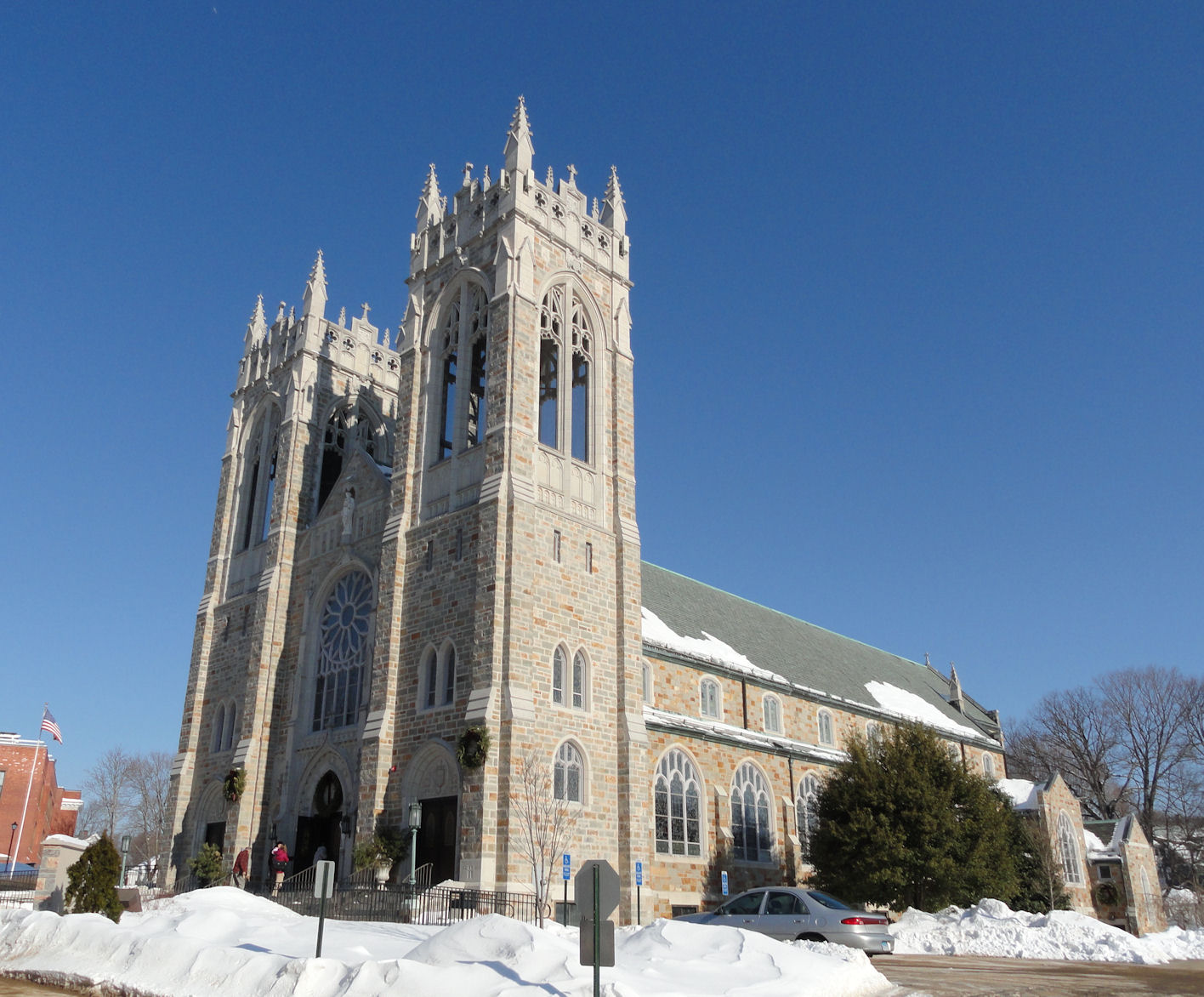
- St. Joseph Church, Bristol, CT; Jackson's Masterpiece
- Born: 1861; Waterbury, Connecticut
- Died: 1940 (aged 78–79)
- Known for: Architect

Joseph A. Jackson (1861–1940) was an American architect who designed many buildings for Roman Catholic clients in the Eastern United States, especially Connecticut.

== Early life and education ==
Jackson was born 1861 in Waterbury, Connecticut and studied in the public schools of the city. After High school he studied for one year at St. Francis College, Brooklyn, New York. Having decided to make architecture his profession, he worked first with Albert M. West, and afterward with Robert W. Hill (1881–1887). Thereafter, he started his own firm with offices in Waterbury.

== Architectural practice ==
At first Jackson worked on a large number of public buildings, including the Bank Street and Clay Street schools, the convents of Notre Dame and St. Mary, St. Patrick's hall, the new High school, the Judd building, and the Bohl building, all in Waterbury, CT. Around 1900 when he moved from Waterbury to New Haven, he decided to concentrate primarily on the design of churches and related buildings, mostly for catholic clients. In an advertisement from the 1921 edition of The Catholic Quarterly Review, he describes his practice as “Church Architect,” that specialized in “churches, convents, schools and ecclesiastical work. Plans and Consultations on all matters pertaining to Church Designing and Construction.” He maintained a satellite office at 184 Livingstone Street, New Haven, Connecticut, as well as his main office in the Townsend Building, 1123 Broadway New York City.

== Works ==
- St. Joseph Church (South NorwalkGreenwich, Connecticut) (first church, dating from 1902. demolished 1969)
- SS. Cyril and Methodius Church Bridgeport, Connecticut
- St. Joseph Church, Bristol, Connecticut
- St. Michael Church, Derby, Connecticut
- St. Margaret Church, Madison, Connecticut
- Our Lady of Mount Carmel Church, Meriden, Connecticut
- St. Jeseph School, Meriden, CT
- St. John the Baptist Church, New Haven, Connecticut
- St. Joseph Church, New Haven, Connecticut
- St. Thomas the Apostle Church, Plainfield, Connecticut
- St. Mary Church, Simsbury, Connecticut
- St. Joseph Church, South Norwalk, Connecticut
- Sacred Heart Church, Torrington, Connecticut
- Our Lady of Lourdes Church, Waterbury, Connecticut
- St. Casmir Church, Newark, New Jersey
- St. Stephen Church, North Plainfield, New Jersey
- St. Leo Church, Irvington, New Jersey
- Our Lady of Mt. Carmel Church, Ware, Massachusetts
- St. Mary Church, Ridgefield, Connecticut
- St. Bernard Church and School, Rockville, Connecticut
- St. Bridget Church, Manchester, Connecticut
- Our Lady of Mt. Carmel School and Convent, Bayonne, New Jersey
