= SS. Cyril and Methodius Parish =

SS. Cyril and Methodius Parish

- SS. Cyril and Methodius Parish, Hartford
- SS. Cyril and Methodius Parish (Bridgeport, Connecticut)
