= Saint Ann Roman Catholic Church and Rectory =

- U.S. National Register of Historic Places
- New Jersey Register of Historic Places
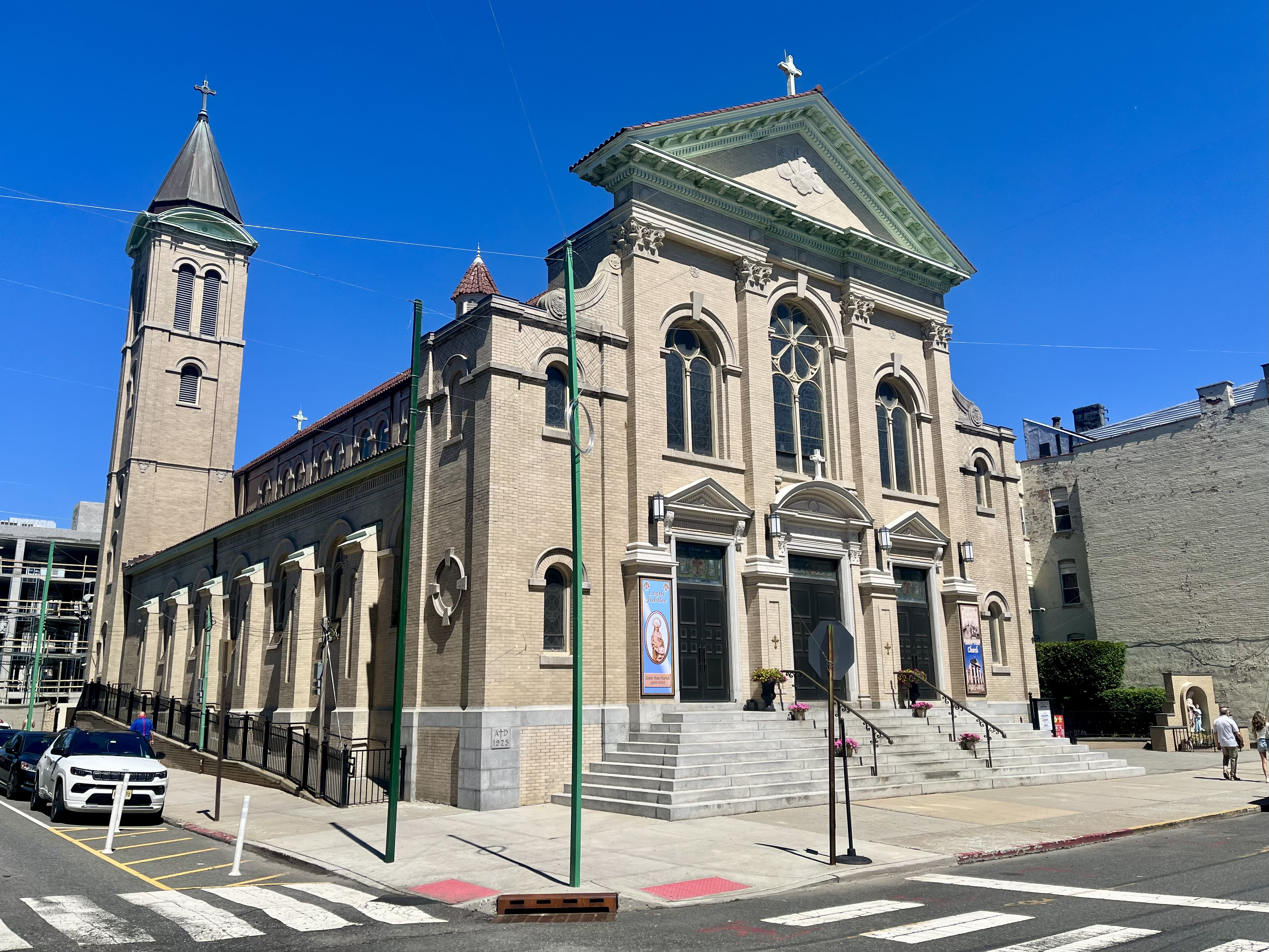
- The church's exterior in 2026

- Location within Hudson County, New Jersey Location within New Jersey Location within the United States
- Location: 704 Jefferson Street, Hoboken, New Jersey
- Coordinates: 40°44′46″N 74°2′10″W
- Built: 1925–1927
- Built by: Louis Infante and Son
- Architect: Anton Louis Vegliante
- Architectural style: Italian Renaissance Revival
- NRHP reference No.: 15000817
- NJRHP No.: 5147

Significant dates
- Added to NRHP: November 24, 2015
- Designated NJRHP: October 2, 2015

The Saint Ann Roman Catholic Church and Rectory is located at 704 Jefferson Street in the City of Hoboken in Hudson County, New Jersey. It was constructed during the tenure of Rev. Michael Gori, who was pastor of the parish from 1921 to 1937. It was added to the National Register of Historic Places on November 24, 2015, for its significance in architecture, religion, and ethnic heritage from 1925 to 1949.

== History and description ==
The church was designed by the Italian-American architect Anton Louis Vegliante using Renaissance Revival style. It was built from 1925 to 1927 by Louis Infante and Son using yellow brick with stone details. The four-story bell tower on the southwest corner is a city landmark and features four cast bronze bells, dedicated to St. Ann, St. Anthony of Padua, St. Francis, and the Immaculate Conception. The interior of the church was decorated by the ecclesiastical artist, Gonippo G. Raggi, and includes paintings, statuary, and stained glass windows. Raggi also decorated the Saint Mary of Mount Virgin Roman Catholic Church in New Brunswick.

In 1927, the Society Madonna dei Martiri was founded in Hoboken and became affiliated with St. Ann's Parish, placing a statue of Madonna in the church and using it for a procession through the city streets during the Feast of Madonna dei Martiri. The society switched its affiliation to St. Francis Church in 1948.

== See also ==
- National Register of Historic Places listings in Hudson County, New Jersey
- List of churches in the Roman Catholic Archdiocese of Newark
