= St. Philip Church (Norwalk, Connecticut) =

Coordinates: 41°07′19.81″N 73°24′44.50″W

The Church of St. Phillip Church
- Interactive map of the The Church of St. Phillip Church area

General information
- Architectural style: Modernist
- Construction started: 1966; 60 years ago
- Completed: 1967; 59 years ago
- Client: Roman Catholic Diocese of Bridgeport

Design and construction
- Architect: George J. Lechner of Lyons & Mather

St. Philip Church
- St. Philip Church
- Location: 1 Father Conlon Pl; Norwalk, Connecticut
- Country: United States
- Denomination: Roman Catholic

Architecture
- Architect: George J. Lechner

Administration
- Province: Hartford
- Diocese: Bridgeport

Clergy
- Bishop: Most Rev. William E. Lori

St. Philip is a Roman Catholic church in Norwalk, Connecticut, part of the Diocese of Bridgeport.

== History ==
The parish of St. Philip was established in 1964 as one of three to be carved out of the large St. Mary's Parish. The pastor of the church at the dedication of the new building in 1969 was Leonard Conlon.

== Buildings ==
The church design dates from around the 1964 establishment of the parish. The church was built 1966–1967 to the designs of local resident and parishioner, architect George J. Lechner, who was an architect draftsman for the firm of Lyons and Mather. The building received the Excellence in Architecture Award from the Bridgeport Association for a Better Community Design, an award given by then mayor, Frank N. Zullo and Judged by architects Thomas Bates, James Evans, and businesswoman Janice Green. Lechner's modernistic designed the church to resemble a Middle-Eastern tent, as the tent is considered one of the first architectural forms in ancient tradition. The structure was formed of fluted concrete. Initially, the artwork was designed by Leslie Dor of Irvington, New York. The contract was awarded in 1967 and the church completed in 1969. The church was first used at Easter, 1969, and was dedicated on November 16, 1969 by Bridgeport diocese Bishop, Walter W. Curtis.
