= Sts. Cyril and Methodius Church (Hartford, Connecticut) =

Historic church in Connecticut, United States

- U.S. National Register of Historic Places
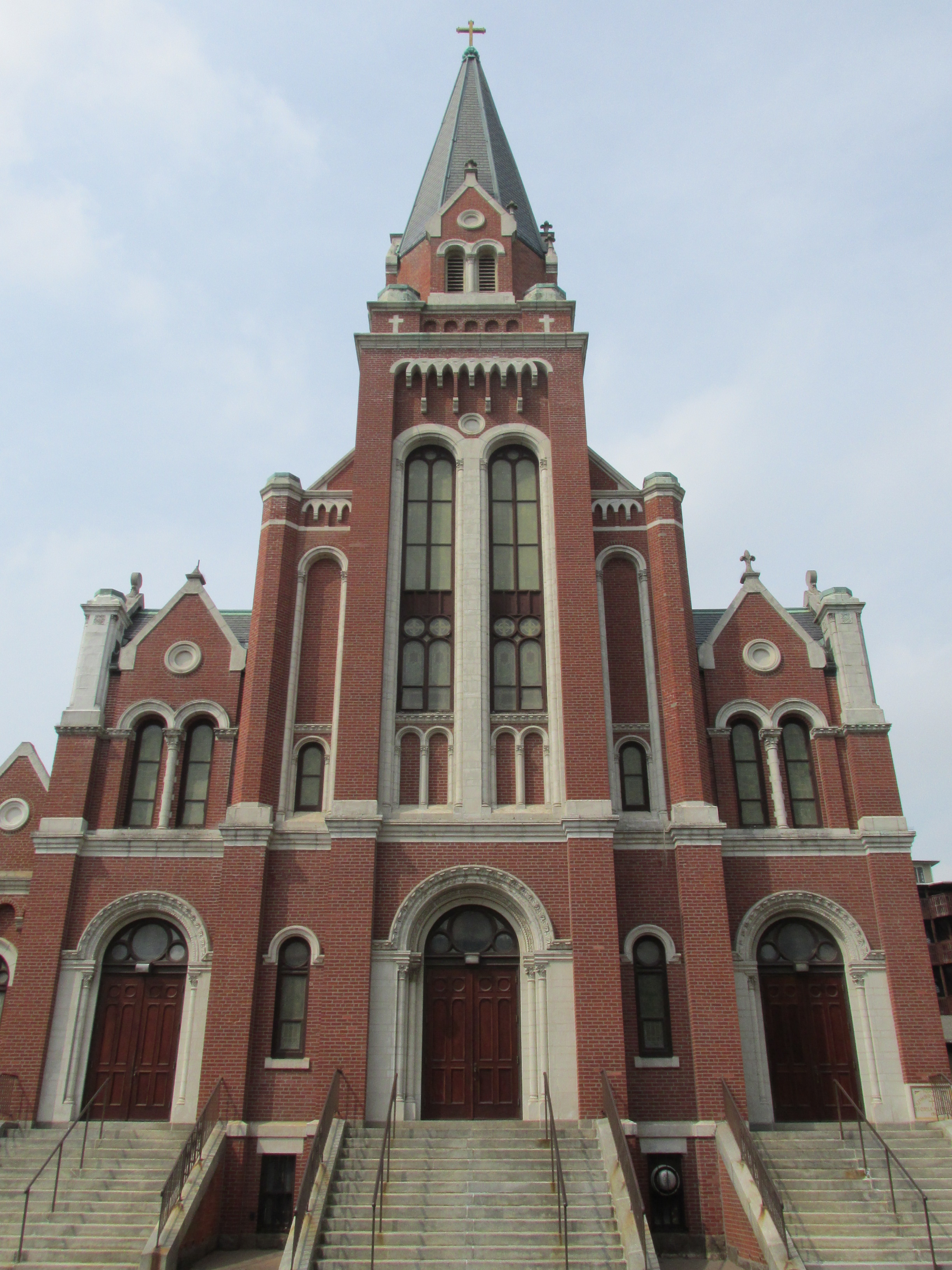
- Sts. Cyril and Methodius Church

- Location within Connecticut Location within the United States
- Location: 55 Charter Oak Avenue, Hartford, Connecticut
- Coordinates: 41°45′29″N 72°40′23″W
- Area: 0.5 acres (0.20 ha)
- Built: 1914
- Architect: O'Connell, Timothy G.
- Architectural style: Romanesque
- NRHP reference No.: 83001254
- Added to NRHP: June 30, 1983

The Sts. Cyril and Methodius Church is a historic Roman Catholic church at 55 Charter Oak Avenue in Hartford, Connecticut. It is a large, two story brick structure with limestone trim, designed by Timothy G. O'Connell and built in 1914 to serve the city's growing Polish-American population. The interior in particular is decorated with symbols generally found in Catholic churches in Poland, including the Polish eagle. The church was listed on the National Register of Historic Places in 1983.

== Description and history ==
The Saints Cyril and Methodius Church is located South of Downtown Hartford, South of Charter Oak Avenue between Charter Oak Place and Popieluszko Court. It is oriented facing East Toward Popieluszko Court, and is separated from Charter Oak Avenue by its rectory. It is a large and elaborately styled Romanesque structure, built out of brick with limestone trim. It has a basically rectangular plan, with a gabled roof along its length crowned by a tall tower at the front. A cross gable projects to both sides at the back end of the nave, with a smaller projection at the narthex. There are entrances on the sides of this latter projection and in the center of the main facade, each set in a round-arch opening with rounded windows above. Above each entrance are complexes of tall round-arch windows, the central one rising to the roof level as part of the base of the tower. The tower is crowned by an octagonal spire and cross.

Hartford's Polish community grew in the Charter Oak area South of Downtown beginning in 1889, as immigrants drawn to jobs in the area. The congregation of Saints Cyril and Methodius was formally organized in 1902, after five years of informal arrangements. It met in a wood-frame church on Charter Oak Avenue built that year. By 1914, the Polish Catholic population had grown to the point where a larger building was needed. The present building was completed in 1916, to a design by Timothy G. O'Connell, an architect based in Boston, Massachusetts.

== See also ==
- National Register of Historic Places listings in Hartford, Connecticut
