= St. Matthew Church (Norwalk, Connecticut) =

Coordinates: 41°06′37.35″N 73°26′52.43″W

- St. Matthew Church
- Location: 216 Scribner Avenue; Norwalk, Connecticut
- Country: United States
- Denomination: Roman Catholic
- Website: stmatthewnorwalk.org

History
- Founded: November 14, 1957
- Dedicated: September 18, 1960

Architecture
- Architect(s): John H. Gaydosh original design Doyal Coffin Architecture revisions

Administration
- Province: Hartford
- Diocese: Bridgeport

Clergy
- Bishop: Most Rev. Frank Joseph Caggiano
- Pastor: Rev. Francis T. Hoffmann

St. Matthew is a Roman Catholic church in Norwalk, Connecticut, part of the Diocese of Bridgeport.

== History ==
Saint Matthew Parish was founded November 14, 1957. Rev. James F. McGrath was appointed the first Pastor. On September 18, 1960, Rev. Bishop Lawrence J. Sheehan officiated at the Blessing of the Cornerstone and Dedication of the completed Spiritual Center for Saint Matthew. This building served various parish needs.
