= St. Jerome Church (Norwalk, Connecticut) =

Coordinates: 41°09′13.43″N 73°24′40.48″W

St.Jerome Church
- St.Jerome Church
- Location: 23 Half Mile Road; Norwalk, Connecticut
- Country: United States
- Denomination: Roman Catholic

Administration
- Province: Hartford
- Diocese: Bridgeport

Clergy
- Bishop: Most Rev. William E. Lori

St.Jerome is a Roman Catholic church in Norwalk, Connecticut, part of the Diocese of Bridgeport.
