= Ss Cyril and Methodius University =

Ss Cyril and Methodius University may refer to:

- Ss. Cyril and Methodius University of Skopje, North Macedonia
- Veliko Tarnovo University in Veliko Tarnovo, Bulgaria
- University of Ss. Cyril and Methodius in Trnava, Slovakia
