= Our Lady of Mt. Carmel (Bayonne, New Jersey) =

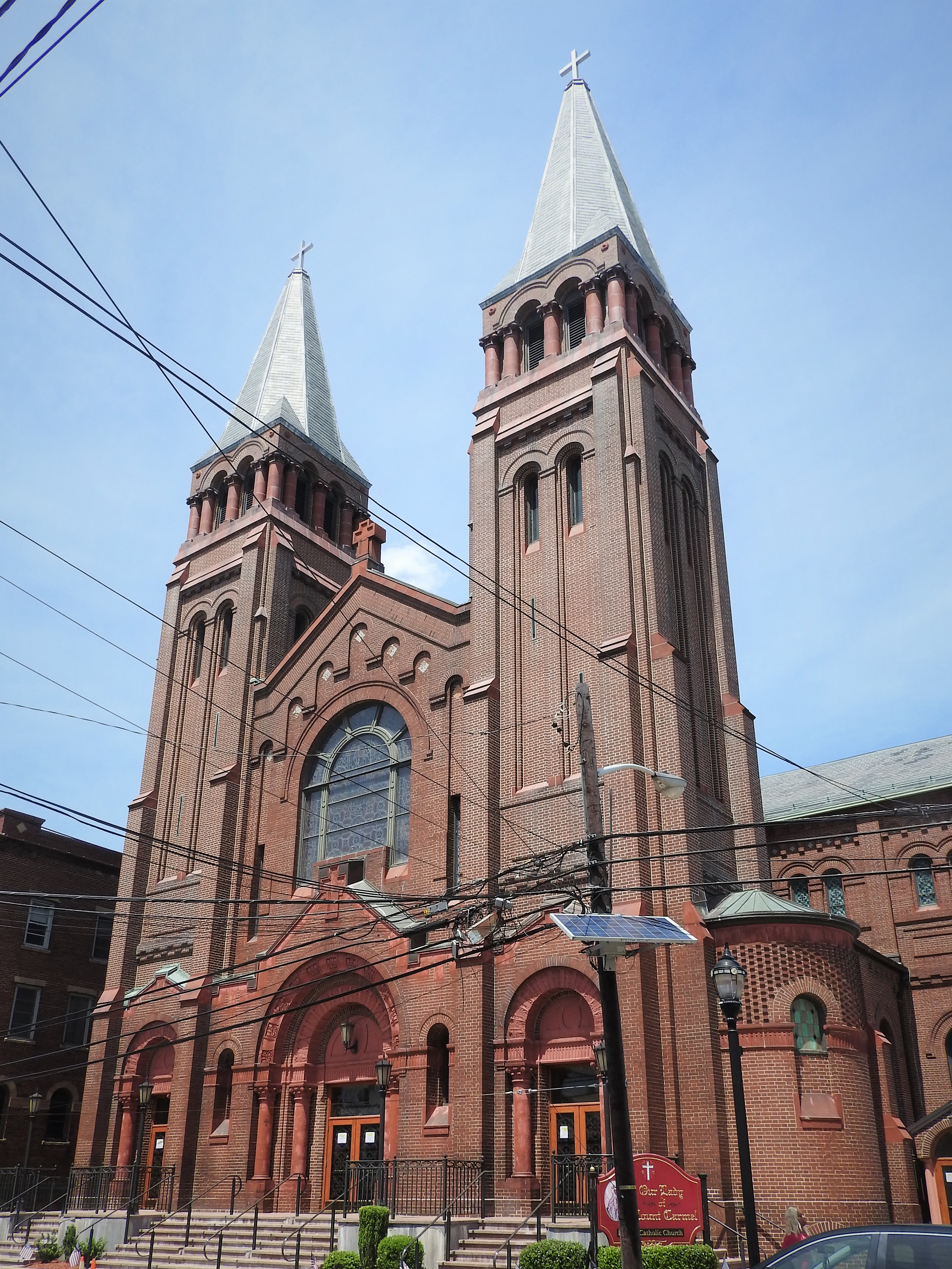

- Location within Hudson County, New Jersey
- 40°39′44.712″N 74°07′02.424″W
- Location: Bayonne, New Jersey
- Country: United States
- Denomination: Roman Catholic

History
- Status: Church
- Founded: 1898
- Dedication: Our Lady of Mount Carmel
- Dedicated: 1899

Architecture
- Functional status: Active
- Architect(s): Robert J. Reiley, Gustave E. Steinback
- Architectural type: Church
- Style: Romanesque Revival architecture
- Years built: 1909-1910

Administration
- Archdiocese: Archdiocese of Newark
- Parish: St. John Paul II Parish of Bayonne, NJ

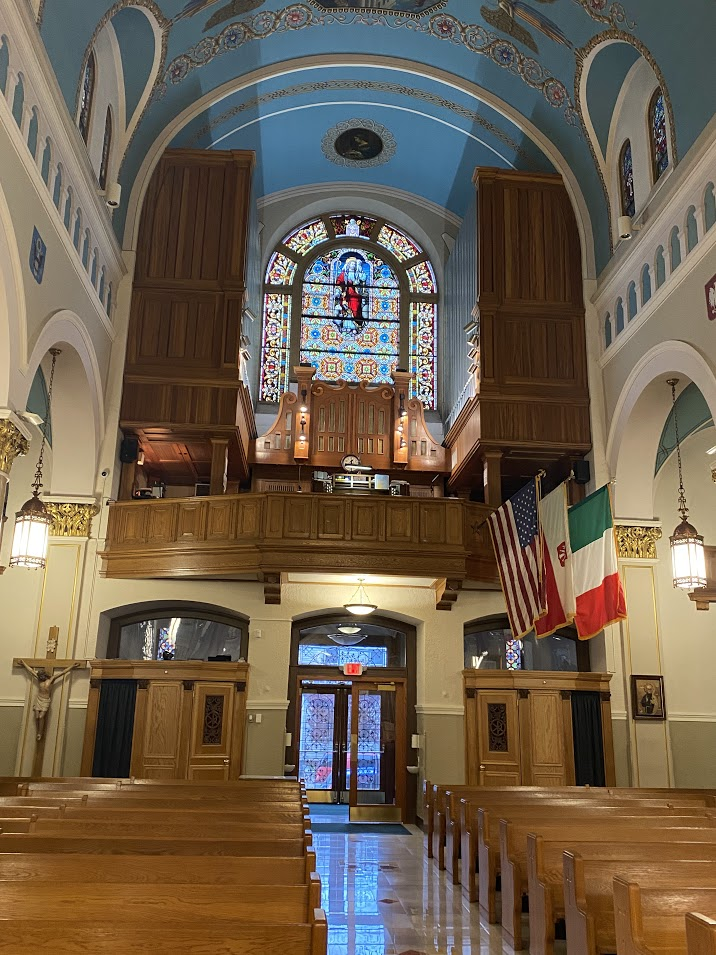
View of the Aeolian Skinner Organ in the rear gallery of the church (Opus 905, 1933) Organ Historical Society with stoplist

Our Lady of Mt. Carmel (Polish: Matki Boskiej Szkaplerznej) is a Roman Catholic church in Bayonne, New Jersey. The name is a dedication to the Blessed Virgin Mary in her role as patroness of the Carmelite Order, hence the name Our Lady of Mount Carmel. Founded by Polish immigrants in 1898, it grew to become one of the largest Polish congregation in the United States. Part of the Archdiocese of Newark, the parish merged with two others to become the Parish of St. John Paul II in 2016.

== Early history ==
In the decades following Bayonne's incorporation in 1866, the city's population rapidly expanded from around 2,000 to over 40,000 by 1900 due to rapid industrialization. The opening of plants in Bayonne by Standard Oil Company, Tide Water Oil Company, Babcock & Wilcox Tubular Boiler Company and many others attracted a large immigrant labor force, including Polish immigrants.

Following a years-long effort by early Polish immigrants in Bayonne to form a parish of their own, the church of Our Lady of Mount Carmel in Bayonne was officially incorporated on January 25, 1898 by Bishop Winand Michael Wigger. These efforts were supported by Rev. Boleslaus Kwiatkowski, Pastor of St. Anthony of Padua Parish in neighboring Jersey City, NJ, the first Polish parish established in New Jersey. Rev. Alexis John Iwanów, a priest of nineteen years, arrived in Bayonne in August 1899 and was officially appointed Pastor of Mt. Carmel Parish on November 9, 1899. The parish initially held religious services in the basement chapel of St. Mary's Roman Catholic Church, the first Catholic parish established in Bayonne. At the time of Mt. Carmel's founding, the other Roman Catholic parishes in Bayonne were St. Mary's (1861) St. Vincent's (1894), St. Henry's (German, 1889) and St. Joseph's (Slovak).

The Parish secured land on East 22nd Street where the Polish parishioners built a simple wooden chapel by hand (after working in the local industries). The church was dedicated on Christmas Day of 1899 by Rev. I. P. Whelan, Pastor of St. Mary's, and the first Mass was held by Rev. Iwanów.

== Parish schism ==
On the Saturday before Palm Sunday 1900, a delegation of parishioners confronted Rev. Iwanów and under the threatened use of firearms they carried with them, demanded control of the parish. With the pastor banished, some 300 parishioners occupied the church, inspired by fears that the church property, funded and built by parishioners, was legally owned by the Bishop, and not the parishioners. A new pastor, Rev. Sigismund Świder, was appointed following Rev. Iwanów's departure. With the church occupied, Rev. Świder oversaw the construction of a new church nearby.

On April 16, 1901, a Bill of Complaint was filed in the Chancery Division of the New Jersey Superior Court contesting the legal ownership of the original church property. The decree of October 26, 1903 recognized the legality of the claim of Our Lady of Mount Carmel parish to the church property, and the church was returned to the Roman Catholic congregation. The original wooden church was converted into the first school building. A segment of the parishioners broke away from the parish and founded Heart of Jesus Church, part of the Polish National Catholic Church.

== 20th-century history ==
Membership within the church exceeded predictions, and the need for a third church building resulted in the construction of the current building in 1909. In 1910 a second school was constructed from a part of the former church building. A year later Paul Peter Rhode, the first Polish bishop in the United States, came from Chicago to bless the new church. Twice the church caught on fire, on December 12, 1912, and on May 30, 1915, The amortization of debt in 1917 preceded its consecration by John J. O'Connor (bishop of Newark) in that year.

During World War II, nearly 3,000 parishioners served in the U.S. armed forces, and 103 gave their lives.

In 1958, a complete restoration of the property took place and in following years a parking lot, parish center, and garages were added. Reverend Thaddeus Zaorski served as pastor from 1968-1989. In 1983, Our Lady of Mt. Carmel School was brought up to safety regulation standards.

== 21st-century history ==
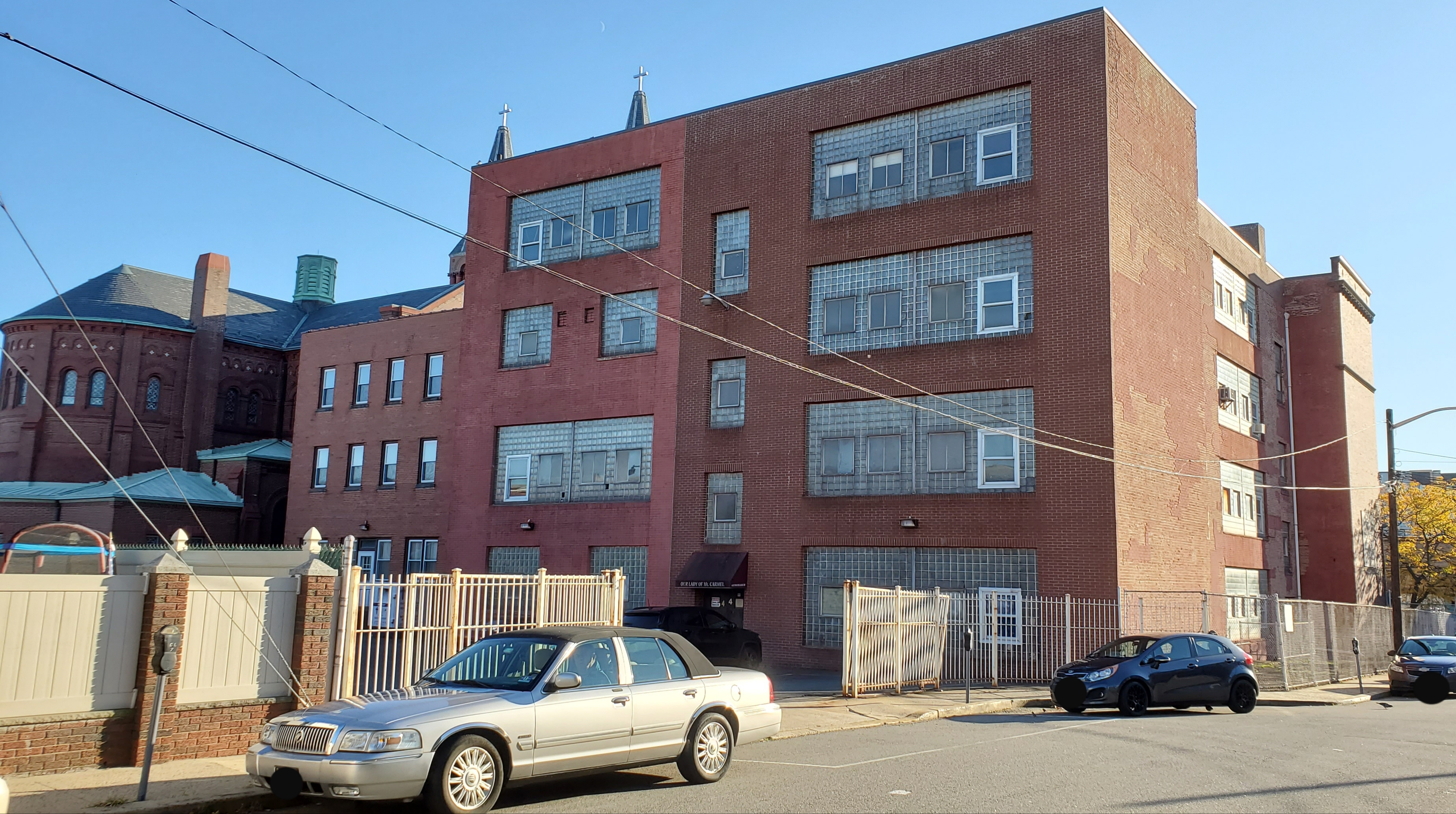
The rear of Our Lady of Mount Carmel School

The entire complex of the parish is still standing, having been little altered since construction. This includes the church (1909), school building (1921), convent, parish center, as well as the parish office/rectory (1930). The complex is the basis for the Mount Carmel Historic District established in 1991.

In 2010 the church commissioned a statue of Pope John Paul II, the first Polish pope.

Due to declining numbers of congregants within Bayonne, in 2016 Our Lady of Mt. Carmel Parish merged with two other parishes (Our Lady of the Assumption and St. Michael & St. Joseph) into the present-day St. John Paul II Parish. The church is administered by the Salvatorian Fathers.

In 2019, the school and convent were put up for sale.

== See also ==
- St. Anthony of Padua Roman Catholic Church
- List of churches in the Roman Catholic Archdiocese of Newark
- History of the Poles in the United States

== Sources ==
1. Żywicki, Robert S. (1983). "85th Anniversary of Our Lady of Mount Carmel Parish" (PDF). Polish American Liturgical Center.
2. Ciccarino, Christopher (2003). "Seeds of Faith, Branches of Hope: the Archdiocese of Newark, New Jersey". Strasbourg, France: Éditions Du Signe.
