= St. John's Church (Newark, New Jersey) =

Historic church in New Jersey, United States

- U.S. National Register of Historic Places
- New Jersey Register of Historic Places
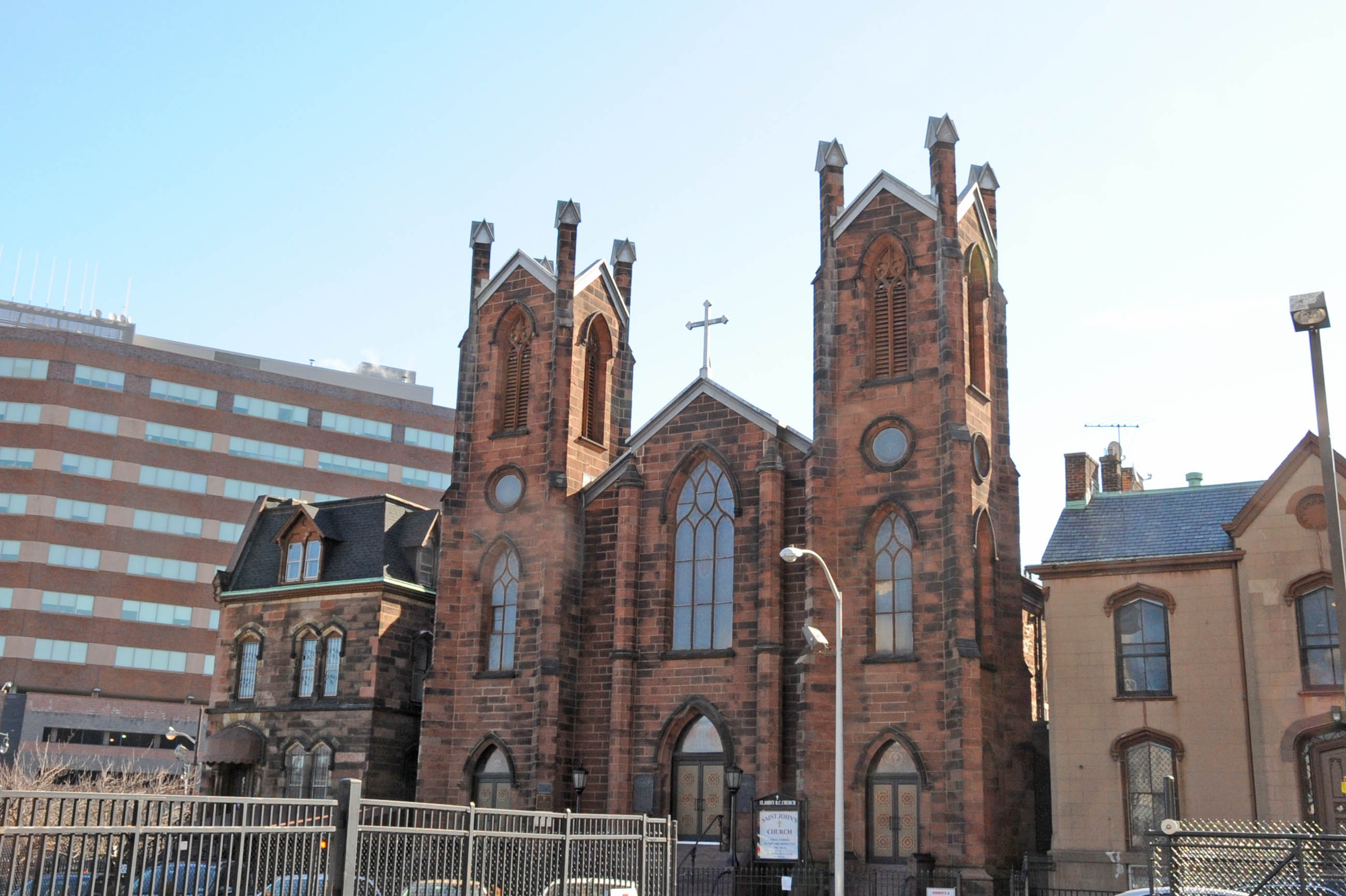

- Location within Essex County, New Jersey Location within New Jersey Location within the United States
- Location: 22-26 Mulberry Street, Newark, New Jersey
- Coordinates: 40°44′17″N 74°9′58″W
- Area: 1 acre (0.40 ha)
- Built: 1827
- Architects: Moran, Father Patrick
- Architectural style: English Norman Perpendicular
- NRHP reference No.: 72000789
- NJRHP No.
- Added to NRHP: October 30, 1972

St. John's Church is a historic Roman Catholic parish church located within the Archdiocese of Newark at 22-26 Mulberry Street in Newark, Essex County, New Jersey, United States. St. John's Church is the state's third-oldest Catholic church.

== History ==
In 1826 the congregation held its first meeting in the basement of Charles Durning's home. Construction of the current building began in 1827. Later renovations and additions took place throughout the 19th and 20th centuries and incorporated the original structure's walls. When the church was first built, it was the only Catholic church in northern New Jersey and was originally part of the Diocese of New York. The church currently runs a soup kitchen, women's shelter, and art gallery for children. The building was added to the National Register of Historic Places in 1972.

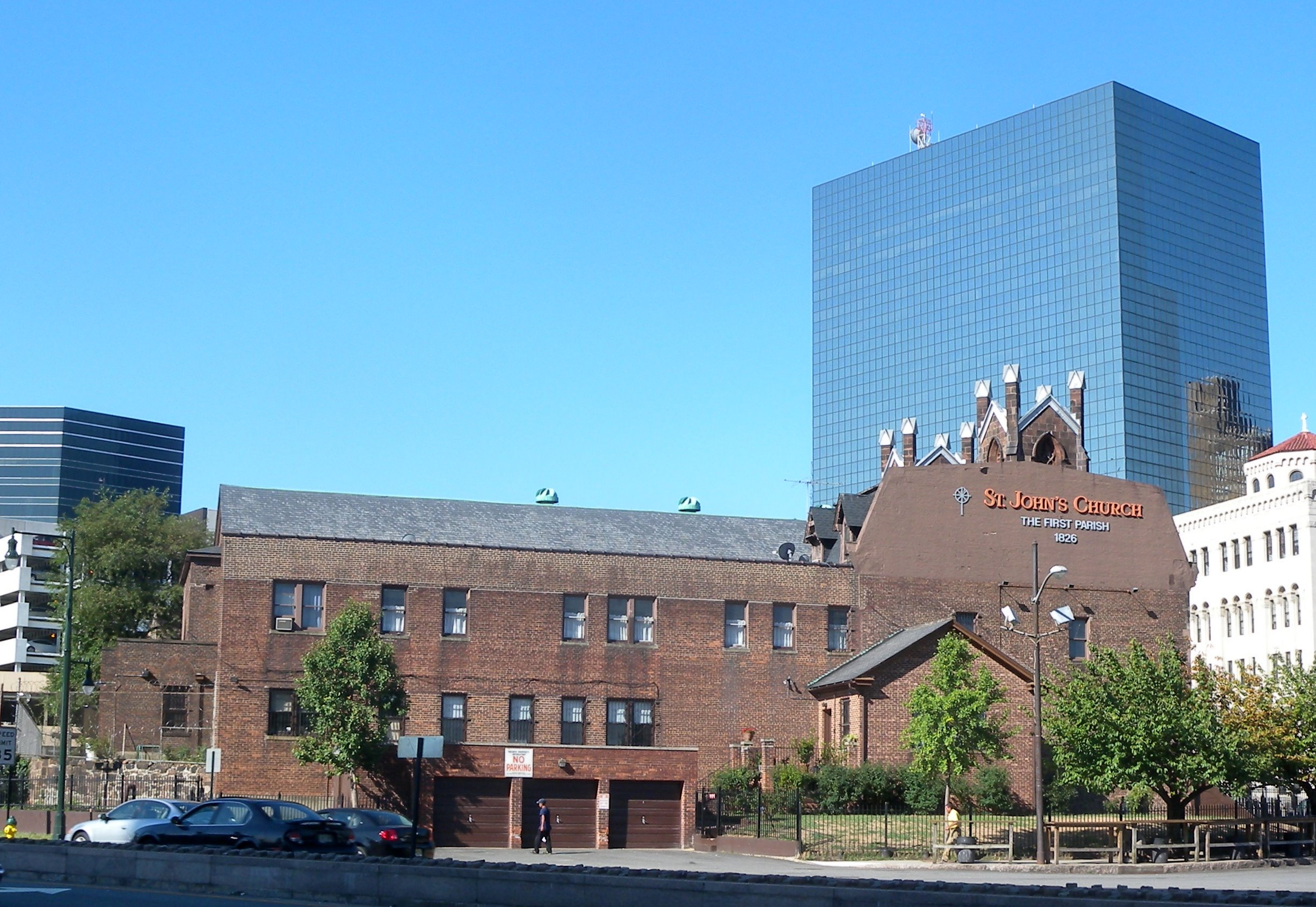
School

== See also ==
- National Register of Historic Places listings in Essex County, New Jersey
