= St. Antoninus Church =

- St. Antoninus Church
- 40.7403°N 74.1994°W
- Location: Newark, New Jersey
- Country: United States
- Denomination: Roman Catholic

History
- Founded: 1875

St. Antoninus Church is a Roman Catholic parish church located at 337 South Orange Avenue within the Archdiocese of Newark, in Newark, New Jersey.

== History ==
The parish was founded in 1875, and was run by clergy of the Dominican Order until just after its 100th anniversary in 1975. Since that time the church has been run by members of the Catholic Charismatic Renewal movement. The present church building dates to 1882, and once contained a main sanctuary (still in use today), and a smaller sanctuary on the lower level of the church building. The "lower church" was largely unused since the late 1960s and was renovated into a community room in the mid-1980s.

The church today serves as a regional base for the Catholic Charismatic Renewal movement, hosting a number of retreats throughout the year, as well as being a parish for its immediate neighborhood. The Gratia Plena Evangelical Community is based at the church, and the former Monastery of St. Dominic is now home to members of the Franciscan Friars of the Renewal. The former Monastery is now known as the Most Blessed Sacrament Friary.

The parish provided clergy support to the nearby Monastery of St. Dominic until the monastery closed in the early 2000s.
