= St. Francis Church (Hoboken, New Jersey) =

Historic church in New Jersey, United States

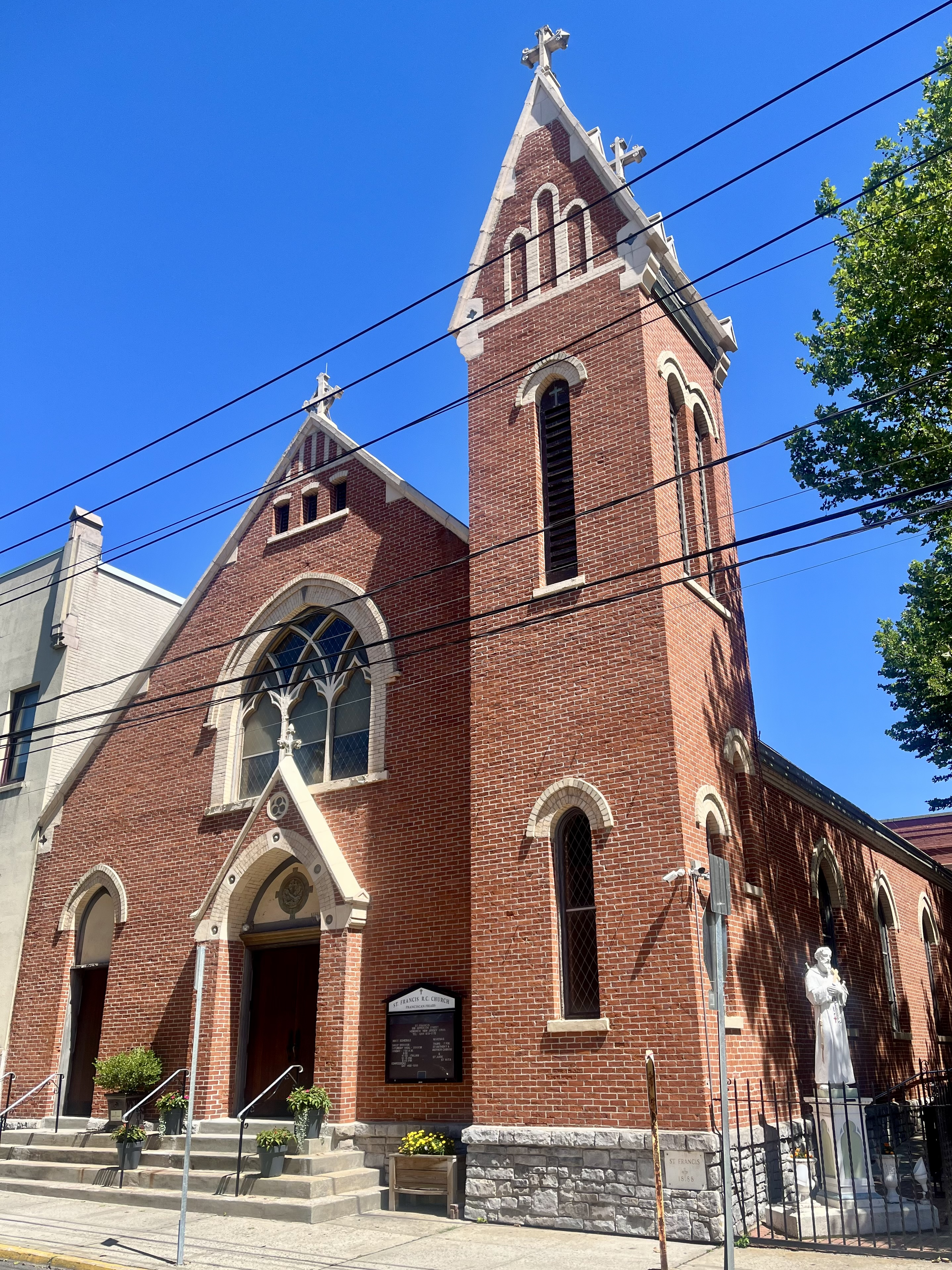
- The church and bell tower in 2026
- St. Francis Church
- 40.7415°N 74.0376°W
- Address: 308 Jefferson Street, Hoboken, New Jersey
- Country: United States
- Denomination: Roman Catholic
- Website: stfrancishoboken.net

History
- Founded: 1888
- Founder: Dominick Marzetti
- Consecrated: May 26, 1889

Architecture
- Architect: Sheridan Manners
- Style: Venetian Gothic
- Groundbreaking: June 13, 1888

Administration
- Archdiocese: Newark

Clergy
- Pastor: Rev. Christopher Panlilio

St. Francis Church is a Roman Catholic parish church in Hoboken, New Jersey, United States. Originally opened in 1889 to serve Italian-speaking immigrants of the southwestern part of the city, it was the first Catholic church constructed for Italians in Hoboken and has remained an important part of the Italian-American community by offering a weekly mass in Italian and hosting activities during the annual Hoboken Italian Festival. Located at the corner of Third and Jefferson streets, the church is near the birthplace of Frank Sinatra and was the site where he was baptized in 1916. The City of Hoboken designated St. Francis Church and its rectory as a historic site in 2012.

== History ==
=== Late 19th century ===
In the 1880s, the pattern of immigration to the United States began to shift from western Europe (including countries such as Germany, Great Britain and Ireland) to southern and eastern Europe (including nations such as Austria-Hungary, Italy and Russia). The majority of immigrants to Hoboken, New Jersey came from Italy. Nearly all of these Italian immigrants were Roman Catholic; they originated from cities in Italy such as Caggiano, Genoa and Molfetta. During this period of time, St. Joseph's Church served Roman Catholics living in the southwestern part of Hoboken. The Franciscan church had been originally established by a group of worshippers who mostly consisted of German immigrants. However, in the latter part of the decade, the congregation of St. Joseph's grew to include large components of immigrants from Ireland and Italy. At this time, the church was conducting its services in three different languages (English, German and Italian), with one mass catering to each of these nationalities. (Note: At the time, St. Joseph's Church was located on Ferry Street (now Observer Highway). The building was subsequently used by the parish as a clubhouse after a new church was built in 1897 on Monroe Street between Ferry and First streets.)

The increased number of Italian immigrants attending St. Joseph's desired to have their own church with services in their native language. During the Great Blizzard of 1888, about 50 families met at St. Joseph's Parochial School and agreed to begin preparations to build a new church. (Note: At the time, St. Joseph's Parochial School was located at First and Monroe streets.) Rev. Dominick Marzetti, the Italian-born pastor of St. Joseph's Church, applied to Bishop Winand Wigger of the Archdiocese of Newark to form a separate church for the Italian parishioners living in the area. A corporation was established and trustees were appointed for the new parish. A committee was formed to identify a site for the new church, and four lots were purchased for $4,885 to acquire a 100-by-100-foot (30 by 30 m) plot of land at the corner of Third and Jefferson streets.

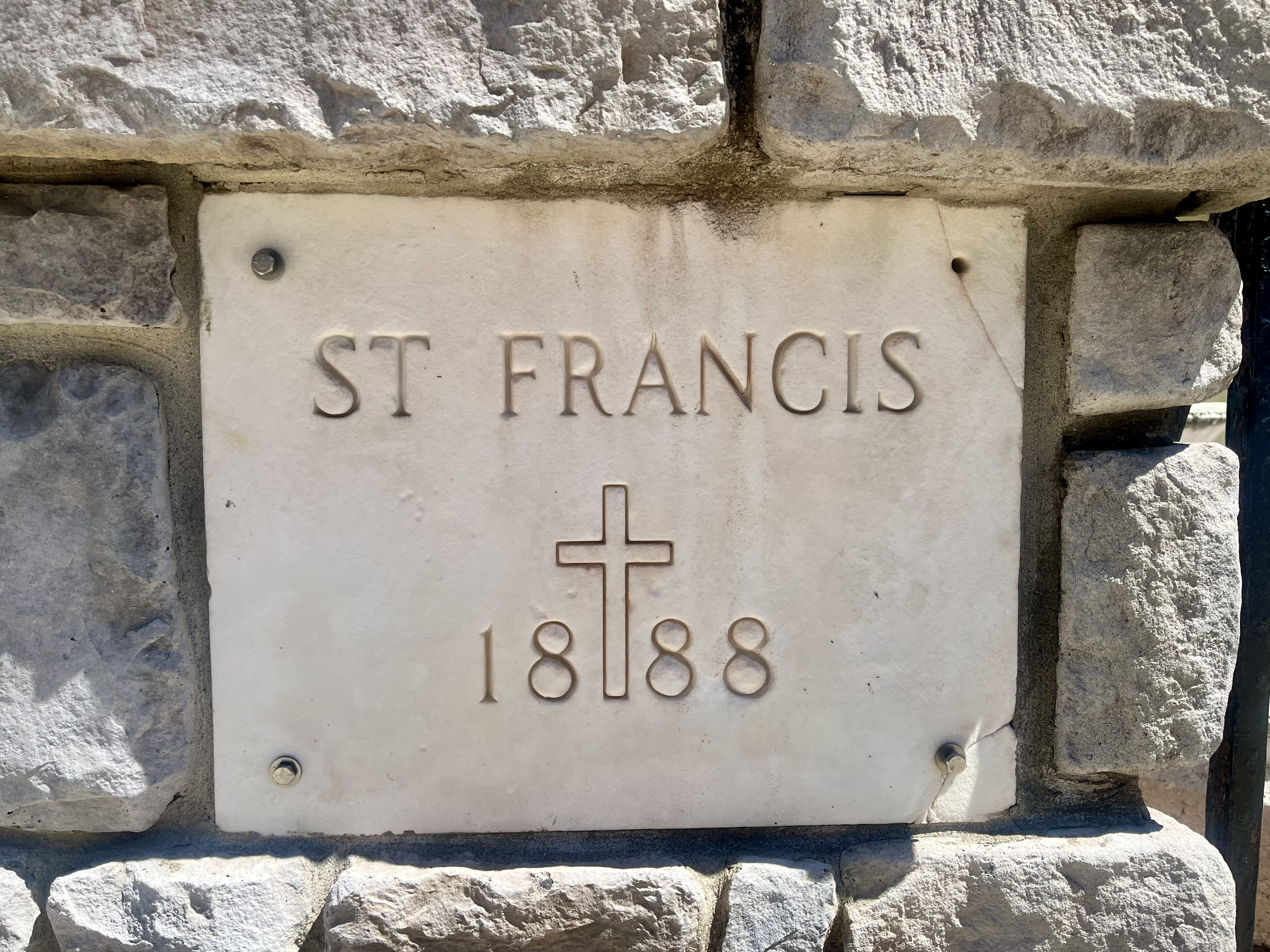
Cornerstone for the church laid in 1888

Construction of the new church began on June 13, 1888 (the feast day of St. Anthony) with the driving of the first piling for the building's foundation. The new church was named in honor of St. Francis and was projected to be completed by Christmas Day. On August 12, 1888 (the feast day of St. Clare), the cornerstone was laid by Bishop Wigger during a ceremony that began with a procession led by a band from the rectory of St. Joseph's Church on Monroe Street to a platform on the site of the new church, which was decorated with bunting and American and Italian flags. Sealed inside the cornerstone was a tin box containing the name of the church, coins, and a slip containing the signatures of Pope Leo XIII, Bishop Wigger, Grover Cleveland, Robert S. Green, August Grassmann (Mayor of Hoboken) and Rev. Marzetti.

St. Francis Church was designed by architect Sheridan Manners, who was the son of former Jersey City mayor David S. Manners. Manners also supervised the construction of the edifice, which fronted on Third Street and was topped with a 45-foot (14 m) tower. Manners designed both St. Francis Church in Hoboken and St. Bridget's Church in Jersey City around the same time period. On May 26, 1889, the completed church was consecrated in a solemn mass in Italian and Latin led by the Right Rev. John J. Conroy, the former Bishop of Albany. St. Francis was the first Catholic church for Italians in Hoboken.

Rev. Marzetti served as the church's first pastor until his death in 1902. Initially he continued to reside at the rectory of St. Joseph's Church on Monroe Street. In November 1890, the parish purchased a two-story frame house on Adams Street from the Hoboken Board of Education for $50. The structure was moved onto a new foundation that had been constructed on Third Street (adjacent to the west side of the church), remodeled and converted into the St. Francis Friary. Marzetti served as the parish's only priest until he was joined by an assistant in 1894.

=== 20th century ===
Around the turn of the century, two groups of parishioners dissented against Marzetti and desired to worship on their own, establishing St. Ann's Chapel and St. Michael's Chapel. In March 1901, Rev. Felix di Persia, a former assistant to Marzetti at St. Francis, was appointed by the diocese as pastor of St. Michael's Chapel and minister to Italian immigrants living in the northern part of Hoboken. The establishment of a new parish to serve the growing population of Italian immigrants had also been under consideration for some time and was supported by Marzetti. (Note: Rev. Marzetti had previously expressed concerns regarding the "contagious fever of building private chapels" in a letter he wrote to Bishop Wigger on August 9, 1898. Such chapels were common in the United States prior to World War II, but only a few remain, such as St. Febronia on Fifth Street between Madison and Monroe streets in Hoboken, which has existed since 1922.) St. Ann's Parish was established in 1900. The new parish was intended to serve all Italian Catholics north of Fifth Street. However, St. Ann's Chapel also wanted its own priest, and 500 Italian Catholics pledged to convert to Protestantism if their demands were not met by the diocese. Later that year, the two dissenting groups, which were also known as the St. Ann's Society and St. Michael's Society, agreed to merge and Rev. di Persia pledged to help raise funds to erect a new church. (Note: St. Ann's Society was established by a group of immigrants from the city of Monte San Giacomo in Italy.) The new parish's first church was located at Seventh and Adams streets and was dedicated in 1904. (Note: The cornerstone for the parish's present church, St. Ann's Church, which is located at Seventh and Jefferson streets, was laid on November 1, 1925.)

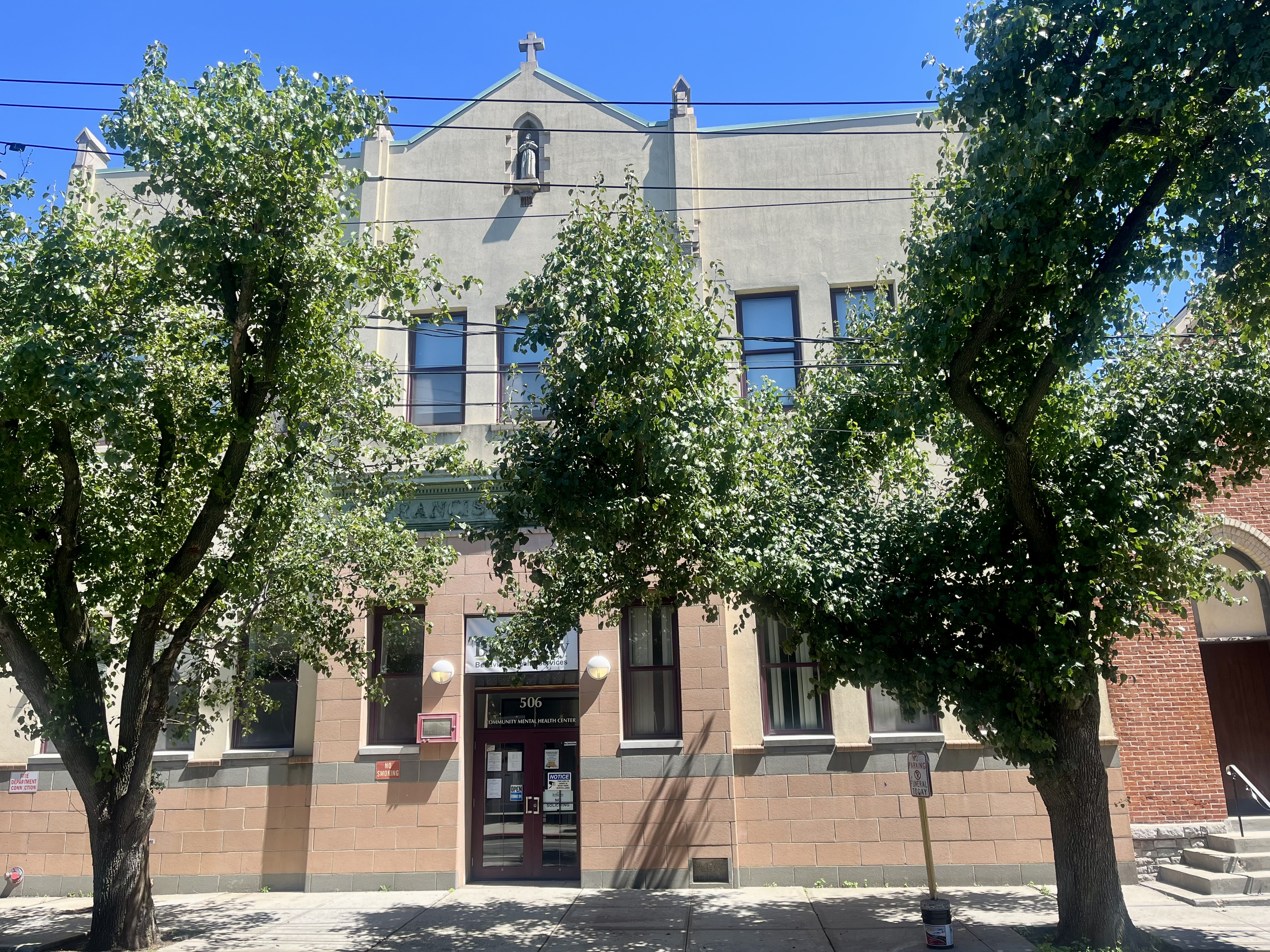
The parochial school in 2026, now a community mental health center

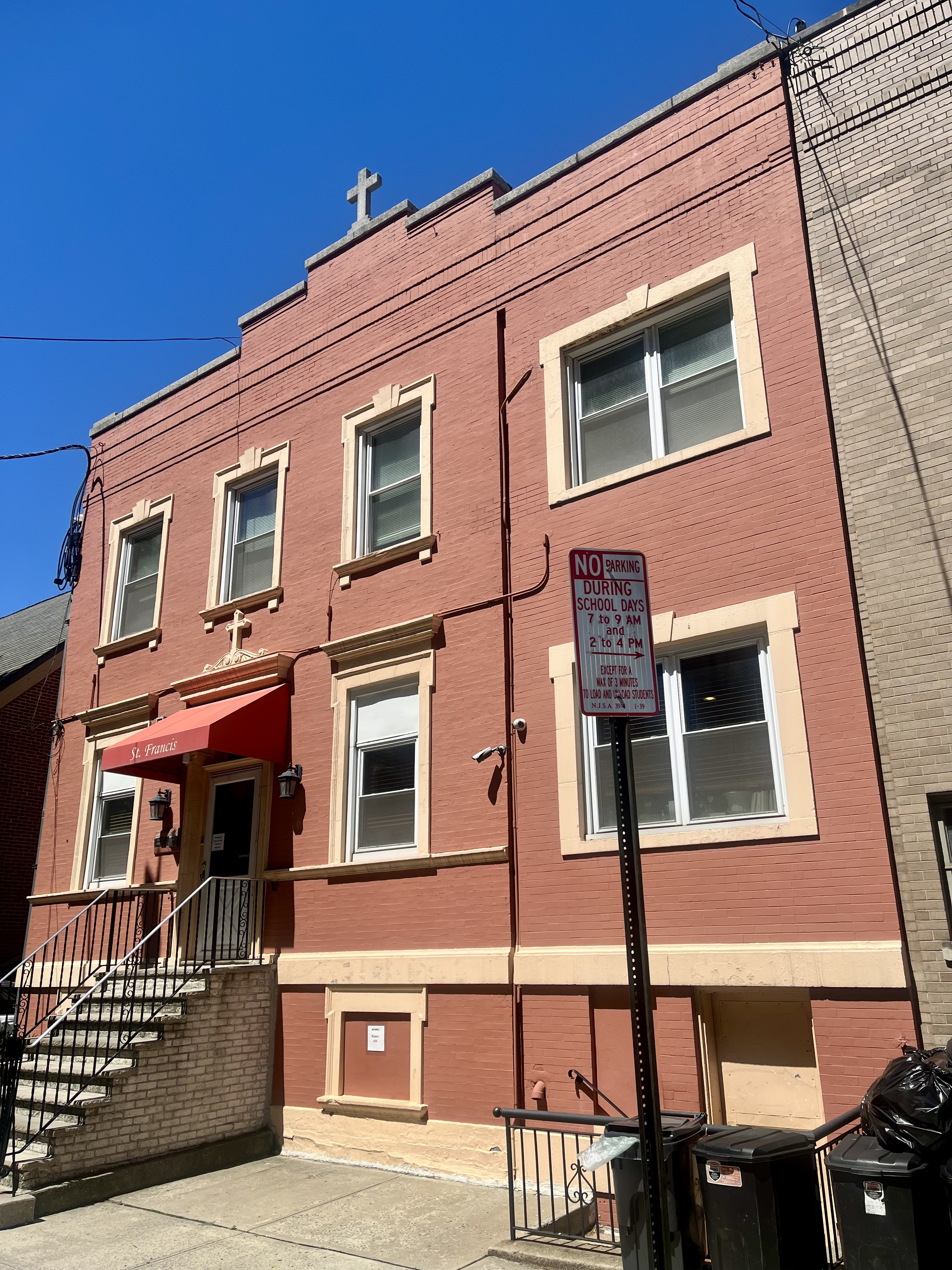
Rectory on the north side of the church

St. Francis Parish did not have its own parochial school until September 1902, when the first floor of a building at 215 Jefferson Street was rented and used by about 150 children as the first pupils. Larger quarters were subsequently needed to accommodate increased enrollment and the school moved to Imperial Hall on Third Street between Adams and Jefferson streets in the beginning of 1905. Meanwhile, construction of a new school building for the parish was planned for the site on the west side of the church occupied by the friary, the latter of which was moved to 303 Madison Street in October 1902; renovations to the rectory were completed in January 1903. The cornerstone for the school was laid on September 11, 1904. A tin box containing the parish history, coins, and a copy of The Observer was placed inside the cornerstone. The one-story school building originally contained four classrooms, but the foundation was designed so that it could be expanded in the future to support up to six stories. The school building was completed one year later. In October 1904, the church acquired property at 308 Jefferson Street (adjacent to the north side of the church), which it planned to use for a new rectory. A new rectory was constructed on the site in 1908.

On April 2, 1916, Frank Sinatra was baptized at St. Francis Church by Rev. Camillus Eichenlaub when he was three months old. The child was intended to be named Martin (after his father Anthony Martin Sinatra), but was instead named Francis (after his godfather Francis Garrick) due to a miscommunication with the priest at the ceremony. Dolly Sinatra did not attend the baptism because she was still at home recovering from childbirth, but when she found out about the mistake in naming her son at the ceremony, she accepted it as a good omen.

An initiative to add a second story to the school building, which was intended to be used as a parish hall and clubhouse, began at the end of 1922. A fundraising campaign to construct the one-story addition was launched in April 1923 and work on the project began in September of that same year.

In 1948, the Society Madonna dei Martiri in Hoboken switched its affiliation from St. Ann Church to St. Francis Church and obtained a new statue of Madonna, which it placed in the church. During the Feast of Madonna dei Martiri, a week-long novena was held at St. Francis Church. Following the solemn mass on Sunday, a procession of members of the society and their families carried the statue from the church through the city streets. Sculpted in Molfetta, the statue was about five feet (1.5 m) tall and required eight men to be carried in the procession. (Note: In the 1990s, the Feast of Madonna dei Martiri was renamed the Hoboken Italian Festival and moved to the week after Labor Day. As part of the festival, the 800-pound (360 kg) statue is still carried from St. Francis Church through the city streets, but now the statue is placed on a boat in the Hudson River for a blessing of the fleet before proceeding to Sinatra Park.)

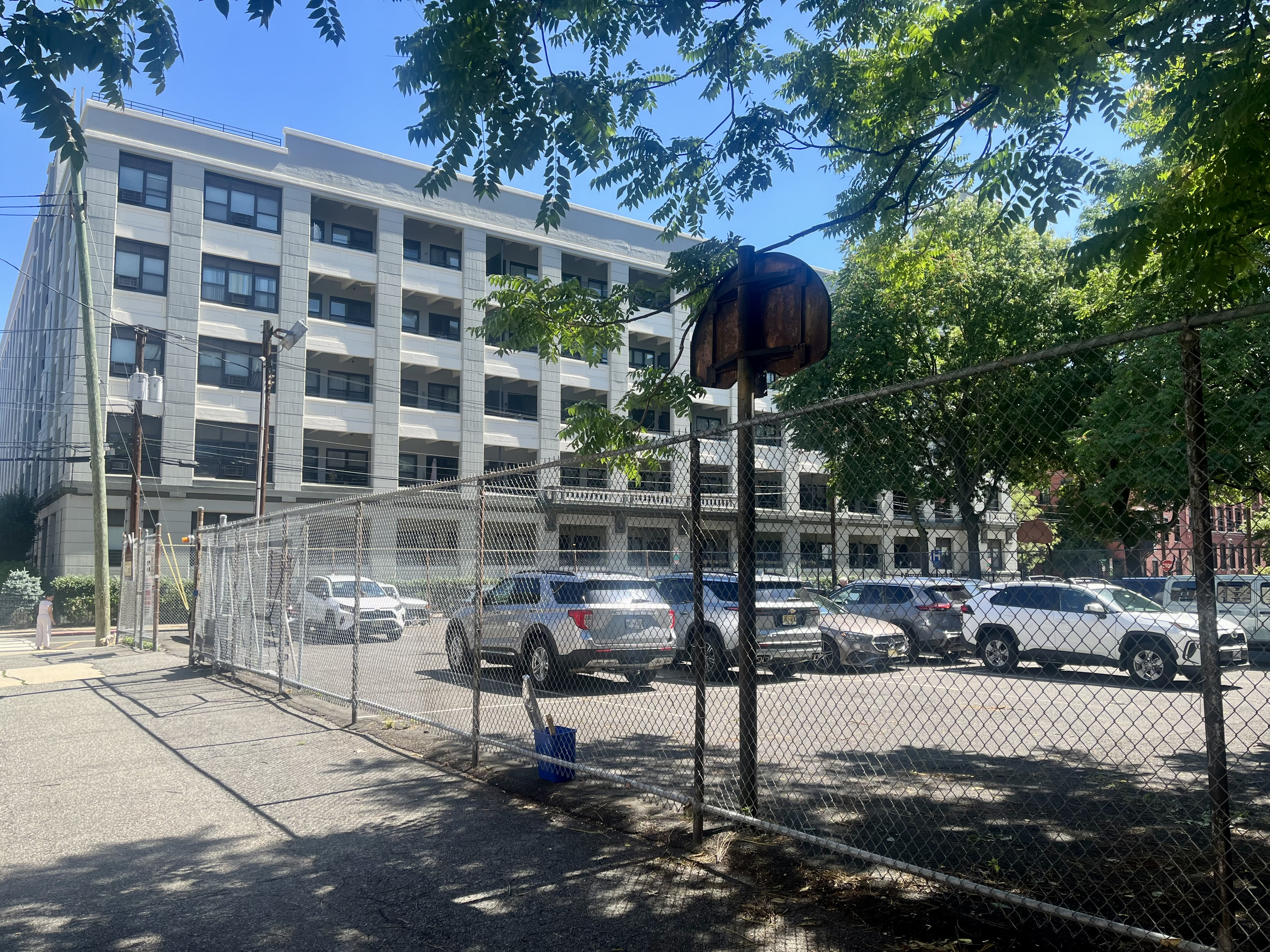
The former site of the playground in 2026, now a parking lot for the church

In 1949, the parish learned that the owners of the Keuffel and Esser Manufacturing Complex at Third and Adams streets planned to sell the 100-by-100-foot (30 by 30 m) plot of land diagonally opposite from the church. The parish asked Keuffel and Esser if they would donate the property to the church and the company agreed. A gift of $6,000 was also provided by the children of the company's founder to help defray the cost of demolishing the old buildings on the site and providing equipment that was used to redevelop the property as the St. Francis - Keuffel and Esser Playground. (Note: The old buildings on the property were from the Hoboken Iron Works, which had previously occupied the site.)

During the middle of the century, white brick face was added to the exterior of St. Francis Church, covering up the original red bricks that had been used in the building's facade. After a piece of the church fell from above the main entrance in 2006 and repairs were needed, the parish decided to restore the building to match its original appearance with the red brick finish.

Renovations to the school building were completed in September 1953, which included the conversion of the recreation center and meeting hall on the second floor into five classrooms. Two of the classrooms on the ground floor were combined into a larger classroom that could also be used as a chapel for children attending mass on Sundays. At the time, the parochial school had an enrollment of about 350 students. The following year, the parish launched a drive to raise funds for the construction of a new youth center located at 310–312 Jefferson Street. The parish had acquired the property four years earlier; the site was formerly used by Keuffel and Esser as an iron foundry and adjoined the rectory. The new structure was intended to include recreational facilities to replace those previously located on the floor of the school building. After the project was approved by Archbishop Thomas Boland, construction contracts were awarded in November 1955. The new parish and youth center was dedicated in October 1956. Four bowling alleys, game and recreation rooms, showers, and a kitchen were located on the building's ground floor. The second floor included an auditorium that could be converted into a gymnasium as well as showers and a kitchen.

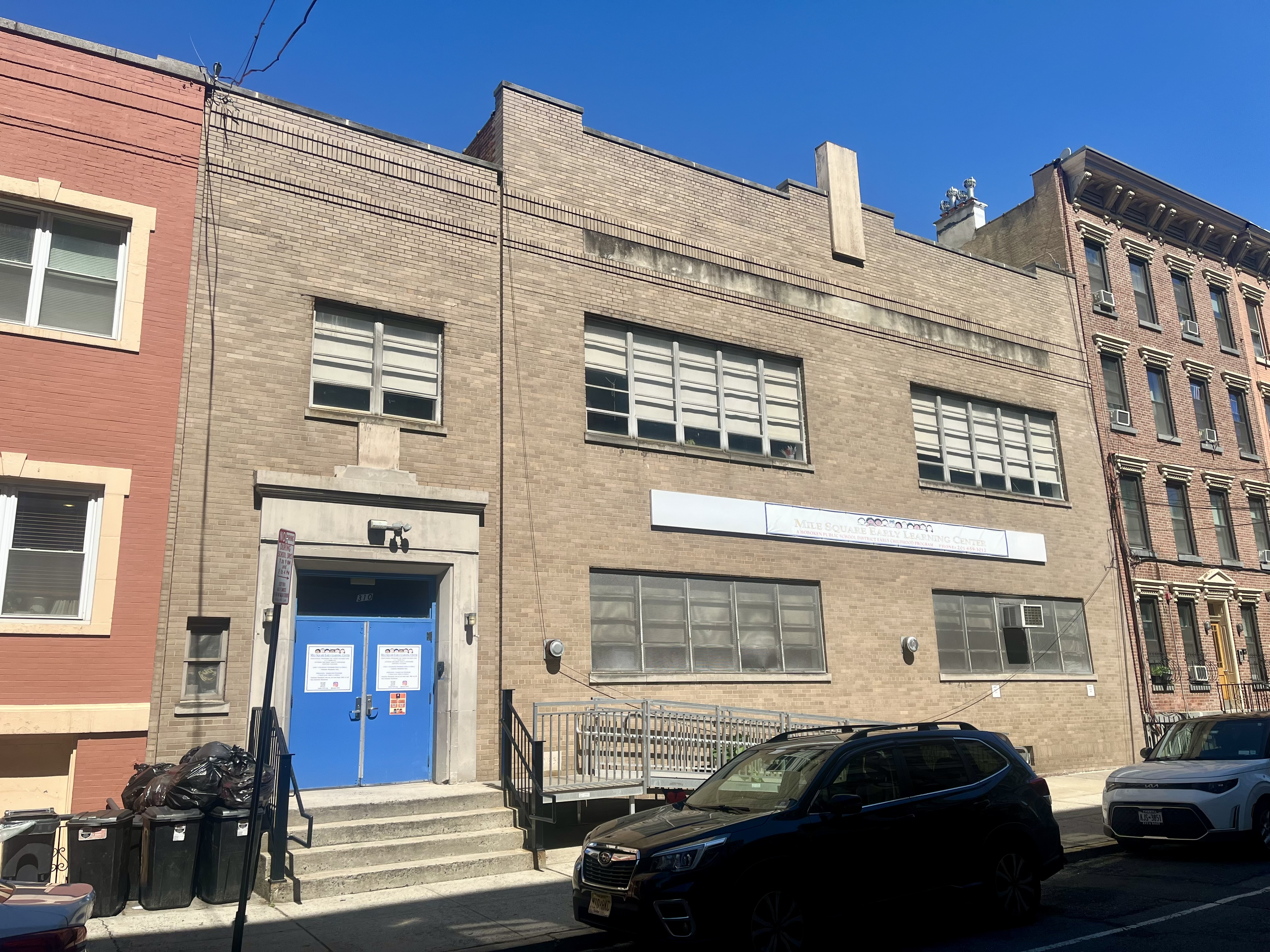
The parish & youth center in 2026, now a Mile Square Early Learning Center site

In May 1956, while the parish and youth center was being constructed, a fire broke out behind the site at an eight-family frame dwelling located at 317 Madison Street. The parish acquired the fire-damaged structure the following month and demolished the building in May 1957, paving over the site to serve as an extended school yard and an exit for the parish's buildings.

The parish's school closed following the graduation of its last class in June 1990; the property was leased in 1997 to St. Mary Hospital to accommodate an expansion of its community mental health center. The new health center at 506 Third Street opened in June 2000 and was blessed by Rev. Michael Guglielmelli, the pastor of St. Francis Church.

In the mid-1990s, attendance at St. Francis Church was increasing, unlike the trend of declining membership at other Roman Catholic parishes. Although the composition of the congregation changed with the addition of Hispanics and other ethnic groups, the church continued to offer one of its Sunday masses in Italian. On May 18, 1998, St. Francis Church held a memorial mass for Frank Sinatra following his death in California. The church was filled to capacity with over 300 mourners and about 200 more people who could not be accommodated inside listened to the mass outside from the street.

=== 21st century ===
In 2006, the parish's youth center was leased to the Salvatore Calabro Elementary School while the public school's building on Park Avenue was undergoing renovations. The building at 310 Jefferson Street has since been used to house the Mile Square Early Learning Center, a preschool provider for the Hoboken Public School District.

The corner of Third and Jefferson streets was dedicated as "Father Michael Guglielmelli Way" in 2012 to honor the retirement of the church's pastor, who had served in that role since 1988. Guglielmelli was born in Hoboken and grew up a few blocks away from St. Francis Church. That same year, the church and its rectory were designated as a historic site by the City of Hoboken.

== Architecture ==
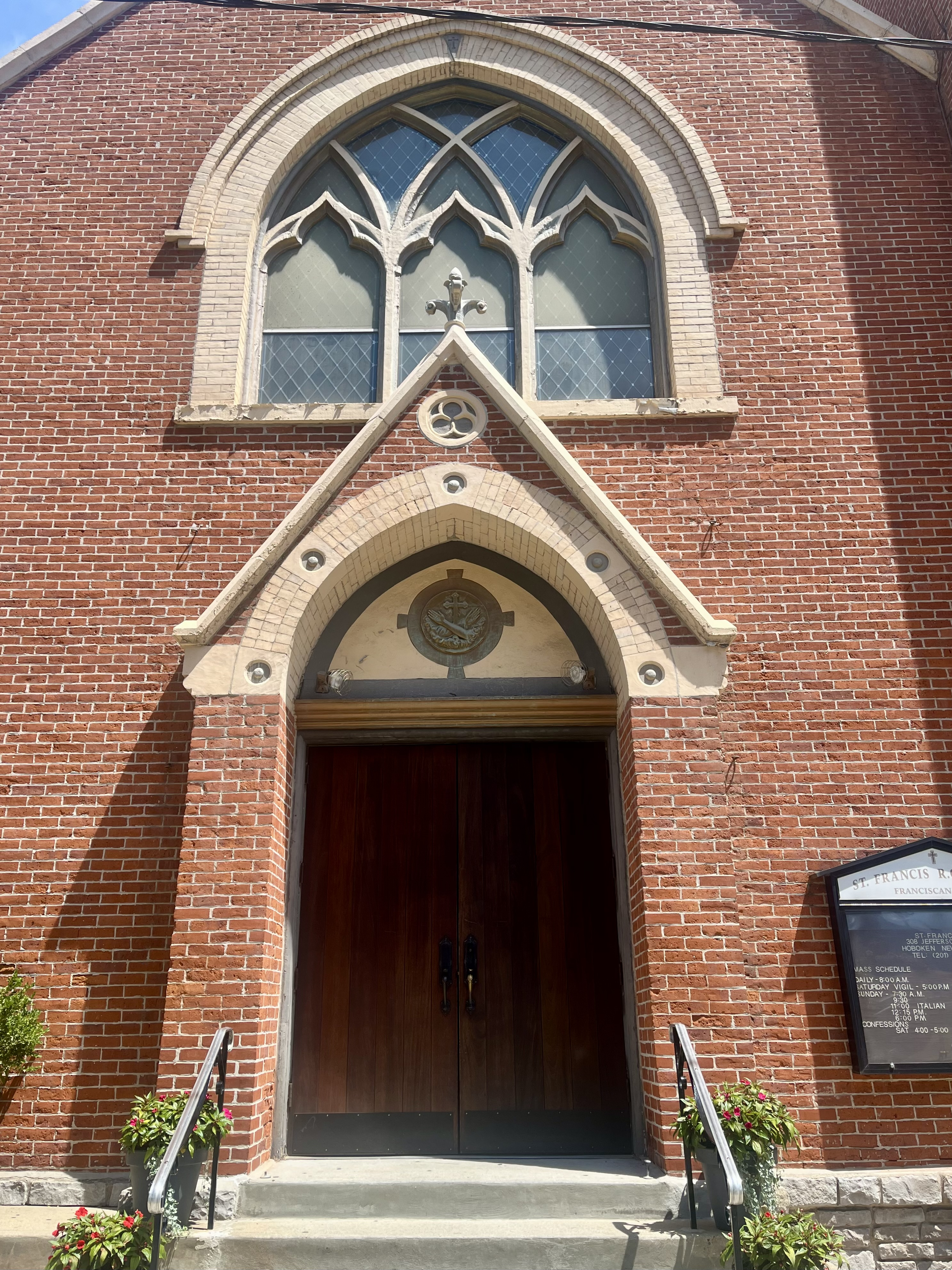
Projecting gable and tracery window above the main entrance

St. Francis Church was designed in the Venetian Gothic style by architect Sheridan Manners. The church is approximately 45 by 95 feet (14 by 29 m) in size, including a five-sided apse at the north end, and is covered by a gable roof. A bell tower is located at the southeast corner of the building and projects out slightly from both sides of the main structure. The base of the church has a stone water table, above which the facade is clad in red bricks fabricated in Croton-on-Hudson with trimmings in beige-colored Ohio bluestone, similar to Manners' design of St. Bridget's Church in Jersey City.

The front of the church faces Third Street and includes a single set of stairs leading to two entrances; the main entrance is located in the center bay and has wood double-leaf doors. Located above the main doorway is a panel containing the church emblem framed by a Gothic arch with contrasting white brick voussoirs; the arch is set within a projecting gable decorated with a trefoil, finial and imposts. The center bay also includes a large tracery window above the projecting gable and dwarf segmental arches below the peak of the gable roof. The left bay contains a single wooden door set below a compound arch of white brick voussoirs.

Along the Jefferson Street frontage, the east side of the church is divided vertically into five bays, each of which has a stained glass window set below a white brick arch. An accessible entrance with a concrete ramp is located on this side of the building. The bell tower has tall, narrow windows near its base and openings with louvers at the belfry, all of which are set below segmental arches of white brick voussoirs. The top of the tower has blank arches in white brick and is topped with crosses at each end of its gable roof.

Within the nave, two colonnades run from the rear of the church to the apse and are located in the center of the rows of pews, dividing the interior into three sections. Five stained glass windows are located in the apse, which are framed by Gothic arches to form a vaulted ceiling.

== Clergy ==
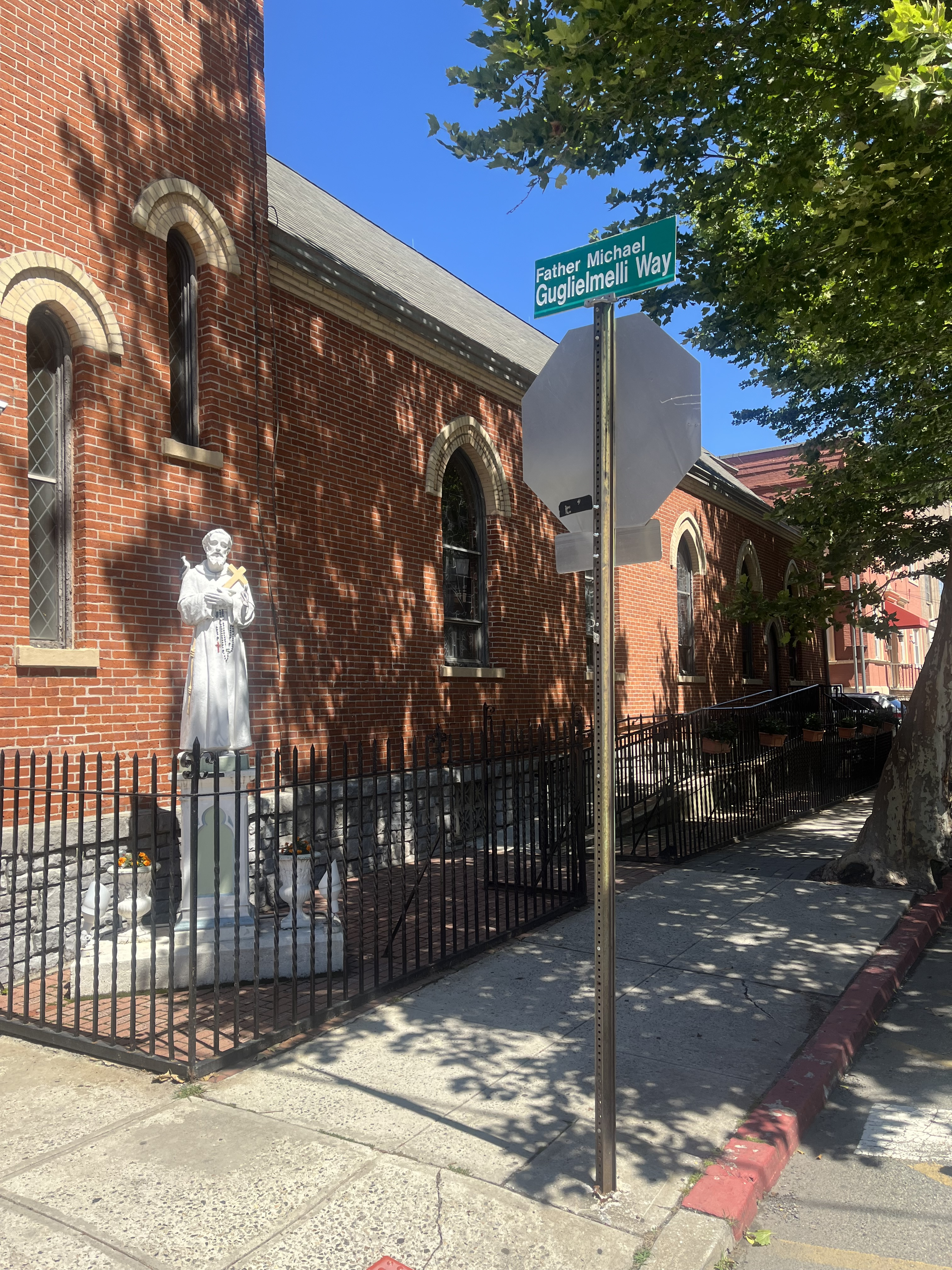
Street sign for corner dedicated as "Father Michael Guglielmelli Way"

Former pastors of the church include:

- Rev. Dominick Marzetti (1889–1902)
- Rev. Ambrose Rheiner (1902–1905)
- Rev. Edward Burgard (1905)
- Rev. Seraphin Peirrotti (1905–1912)
- Rev. Camillus Eichenlaub (1912–1929, 1932–1947)
- Rev. Boniface Henig (1929–1932)
- Rev. Maurice Imhoff (1947–1954)
- Rev. Terence Woulihan (1954–1955)
- Rev. Crispin Fuino (1955–1966)
- Rev. Armand Sorento (1966–1970)
- Rev. Charles Nelipowitz (1970–1972)
- Rev. Julius Toth (1972–1976)
- Rev. Bertin Vesey (1976–1982)
- Rev. Timothy Lyons (1982–1988)
- Rev. Michael Guglielmelli (1988–2012)
- Rev. Christopher Panlilio (2012–)
