= St. Casimir's Roman Catholic Church (Newark, New Jersey) =

Historic church in New Jersey, United States

- U.S. National Register of Historic Places
- New Jersey Register of Historic Places
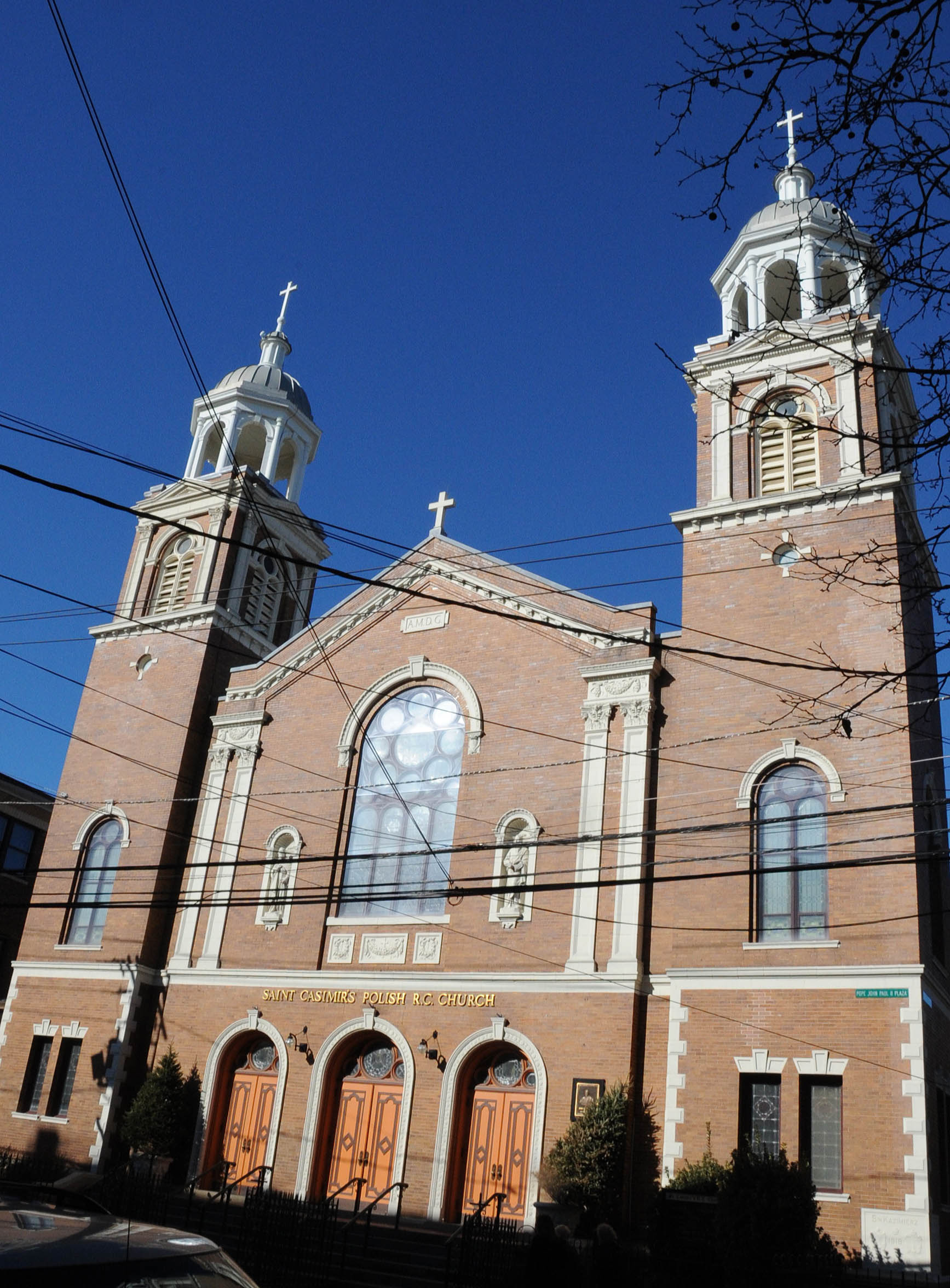

- Location within Essex County, New Jersey Location within New Jersey Location within the United States
- Location: 164 Nichols Street; Newark, New Jersey
- Coordinates: 40°43′24″N 74°9′32″W
- Area: 0.5 acres (0.20 ha)
- Built: 1917
- Architects: Joseph A. Jackson; Ludwig Von Gerichten (artisan)
- Architectural style: Renaissance
- NRHP reference No.: 97000773
- NJRHP No.
- Added to NRHP: July 9, 1997

St. Casimir's Roman Catholic Church is a historic Roman Catholic parish church located within the Archdiocese of Newark at 164 Nichols Street in the Ironbound section of Newark, Essex County, New Jersey, United States. The church was built in 1917 and added to the National Register of Historic Places in 1997.

== See also ==
- National Register of Historic Places listings in Essex County, New Jersey
