= Church of Saints Cyril and Methodius, Vinkovci =

Parish Church of Saints Cyril and Methodius
- Župna crkva svetih Ćirila i Metoda
- Location within Croatia
- Parish Church of Saints Cyril and Methodius
- 45.282355°N 18.818032°E
- Location: Ervenička 1, Vinkovci
- Country: Croatia
- Denomination: Roman Catholic

History
- Status: Parish church

Architecture
- Functional status: Active
- Architect: Željko Markasović
- Completed: 1984

Administration
- Metropolis: Metropolis of Đakovo-Osijek
- Archdiocese: Archdiocese of Đakovo-Osijek
- Parish: Parish of Saints Cyril and Methodius - Vinkovci 5

The Church of Saints Cyril and Methodius (Croatian: Crkva svetih Ćirila i Metoda) is a Roman Catholic church in Vinkovci, Croatia.

== History ==
The church was built in 1984.

It was damaged during the Croatian War of Independence, but renovated in 1997.
