= Sts. Cyril and Methodius Church (Bridgeport, Connecticut) =

Coordinates: 41°11′08.13″N 73°10′38.45″W

Saints Cyril and Methodius Parish
- Saints Cyril and Methodius Parish
- Location: 79 Church Street; Bridgeport, Connecticut
- Country: United States
- Denomination: Roman Catholic

History
- Founded: 1905

Architecture
- Architect: Joseph A. Jackson

Administration
- Province: Hartford
- Diocese: Bridgeport

Clergy
- Bishop: Most Rev. Frank J. Caggiano

Sts. Cyril and Methodius Oratory is a Roman Catholic church in Bridgeport, Connecticut, now part of the Diocese of Bridgeport. Since 2017, it has been administered by the Institute of Christ the King Sovereign Priest.

== History ==
Sts. Cyril and Methodius was the second of two of Bridgeport's Slovak national parishes created out of the parish of St. John Nepomucene Slovak National Church (1891–1991). This elegant Romanesque Revival church dates from shortly after the parish's founding in 1905. The New York City church architect, Joseph A. Jackson, designed the building.

Father Stephen Panik, for whom Father Panik Village was named, had been the church's pastor from the early 1930s until his death in 1953.

The church, itself, was initially established by the St. Joseph Society, with its materials and records integral to the foundations of the St. Stephen's Society and the National Slovak Society respectively.

== Institute of Christ the King Sovereign Priest ==
Since October 8, 2017, the church has been placed under the pastoral care of the Institute of Christ the King Sovereign Priest.

They celebrate Mass in accordance with the 1962 Roman Missal in Latin, as is authorized by Pope Benedict XVI's motu proprio Summorum Pontificum. This is the only Catholic church in Bridgeport that has a regularly scheduled Mass in that form.
