= Frank Joseph Rodimer =

American prelate

His Excellency, The Most Reverend Frank Joseph Rodimer
- Bishop of Paterson
- Church: Catholic Church
- See: Diocese of Paterson
- Appointed: December 5, 1977
- Installed: February 28, 1978
- Term ended: June 1, 2004
- Predecessor: Lawrence B. Casey
- Successor: Arthur J. Serratelli

Orders
- Ordination: May 19, 1951 by Thomas Aloysius Boland
- Consecration: February 28, 1978 by Peter Leo Gerety, Joseph Bernardin, and Peter Poreku Dery

Personal details
- Born: October 25, 1927 Rockaway, New Jersey, U.S.
- Died: December 6, 2018 (aged 91) Totowa, New Jersey, U.S.
- Education: St. Charles College; St. Mary's Seminary; Catholic University of America

Styles of Frank Joseph Rodimer
- Reference style: His Excellency; The Most Reverend
- Spoken style: Your Excellency
- Religious style: Bishop

Frank Joseph Rodimer (October 25, 1927 – December 6, 2018) was an American prelate of the Catholic Church. He served as the sixth bishop of the Diocese of Paterson in New Jersey from 1977 to 2004.

== Biography ==
=== Early life ===
Frank Rodimer was born on October 25, 1927, in Rockaway, New Jersey. He graduated from Seton Hall Preparatory School in South Orange, New Jersey, then attended St. Charles College in Catonsville, Maryland, and St. Mary's Seminary in Baltimore, Maryland.

=== Priesthood ===
Rodimer was ordained to the priesthood at the Cathedral of St. John the Baptist in Paterson, New Jersey, by Archbishop Thomas Aloysius Boland for the Diocese of Paterson on May 19, 1951. He then studied at the Catholic University of America in Washington, D.C., obtaining his licentiate in theology in 1951. He also received a doctorate in canon law in 1954 for a thesis entitled The Canonical Effects of Infamy of Fact: A Historical Synopsis and Commentary, published by the Catholic University of America Press.

In June 1954, Rodimer returned to New Jersey and was appointed assistant chancellor of the diocese and secretary of the diocesan tribunal. During this time, he also served as assistant pastor to St. Brendan's Parish in Clifton, New Jersey.

Rodimer was appointed first diocesan director of sacred liturgy. He was named priest-secretary of Bishop James J. Navagh and attended the sessions of the Second Vatican Council in Rome from 1962 to 1965 as Navagh's principal aide. In December 1964, Rodimer was appointed secretary of the diocesan College of Consultors. As priest-secretary, Rodimer was in Rome when Navagh died there in October 1965. He accompanied Navagh's body to New Jersey for burial.

Under his predecessor Bishop Lawrence B. Casey, Rodimer served as administrator of Our Lady of the Lake Parish in Sparta, New Jersey, from April 1967 to January 1968, at which time he became pastor of St. Paul's Parish in Clifton, New Jersey. Rodimer also served as chancellor, and in that capacity, was elected diocesan administrator by the diocesan College of Consultors upon Casey's death in June 1977.

=== Bishop of Paterson ===
On December 5, 1977, Pope Paul VI appointed Rodimer as the sixth bishop of Paterson, the first native-born bishop in the diocese. He was consecrated bishop at the Cathedral of St. John the Baptist on February 28, 1978, with Archbishop Peter Gerety as principal consecrator, and Archbishops Joseph Bernardin and Peter Poreku Dery serving as co-consecrators.

As bishop, Rodimer wrote a weekly column for the diocesan newspaper, The Beacon. He also established a $7 million diocesan endowment to support Catholic schools, parishes and other diocesan ministries through fund raising. With corporate leaders, Rodimer established the Tri-County Scholarship fund to provide scholarships to needy students attending Catholic schools. During his tenure, Rodimer made public his opposition to capital punishment and to permanent replacements for striking workers.

Although he once declared, "I fear for a society which deplores but does little or nothing to address the horrible daily realities which many of our children face", Rodimer admitted his "own inadequacy" in failing to prevent at least four of his clerical colleagues, with whom he shared a Long Island beach house, from committing sexual abuse.

=== Retirement and legacy ===
Rodimer retired as bishop of Paterson on June 1, 2004, after twenty-six years of service. A 2020 report revealed that a Diocese of Paterson priest had informed Rodimer in the late 1980s of allegations that former Cardinal Theodore McCarrick had sexually abused boys at his beach house and that Rodimer had responded that he would contact U.S. representatives of the Vatican.

Frank Rodimer died on December 6, 2018, at his residence in St. Joseph’s Home for the Elderly in Totowa, New Jersey, aged 91.

== See also ==
- Catholic Church hierarchy
- Catholic Church in the United States
- Historical list of the Catholic bishops of the United States
- List of Catholic bishops of the United States
- Lists of patriarchs, archbishops, and bishops

== Episcopal succession ==
Catholic Church titles
Preceded by Lawrence B. Casey	Bishop of Paterson; February 28, 1978 – June 1, 2004	Succeeded by Arthur J. Serratelli
