= Pius Anthony Benincasa =

20th-century American Catholic bishop

Most Reverend Pius A. Benincasa
- Auxiliary Bishop of Buffalo
- Church: Catholic Church
- See: Titular See of Buruni
- Appointed: May 8, 1964
- In office: June 29, 1964 - August 13, 1986

Orders
- Ordination: March 12, 1937
- Consecration: June 29, 1964 by James A. McNulty

Personal details
- Born: July 8, 1913 Niagara Falls, New York
- Died: August 13, 1986 (aged 73) Buffalo, New York
- Motto: Christo Servire

Pius Anthony Benincasa (July 8, 1913 – August 13, 1986) was a bishop of the Catholic Church in the United States. He served as an auxiliary bishop of the Diocese of Buffalo from 1964 to 1986.

== Biography ==
Born in Niagara Falls, New York, Benincasa was ordained a priest on March 27, 1937, for the Diocese of Buffalo. On May 8, 1964 Pope Paul VI appointed him as the Titular Bishop of Buruni and Auxiliary Bishop of Buffalo. He was consecrated by Bishop James A. McNulty on June 29, 1964. The principal co-consecrators were Archbishop Celestine Damiano of Camden and Bishop James Navagh of Paterson. He attended the third and fourth sessions of the Second Vatican Council (1964-1965). Benincasa served as auxiliary bishop until his death on August 13, 1986, at the age of 73.

Catholic Church titles
Preceded by –	Auxiliary Bishop of Buffalo; 1964–1986	Succeeded by –
