= Proselytism =

Attempt to convert others to a religion

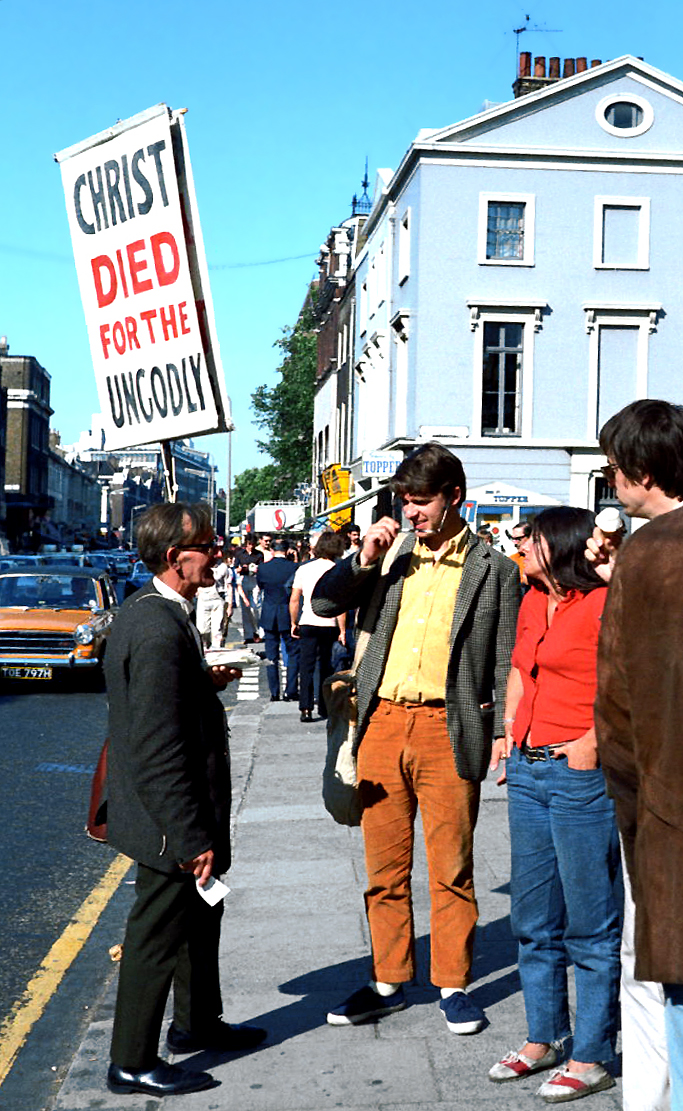
A Christian proselytizer trying to spread his faith in London, England, 1970

Proselytism (/ˈprɒsəlɪtɪzəm/) is the policy of attempting to convert people's religious beliefs. Carrying out attempts to instill beliefs can be called proselytization.

Proselytism is illegal in some countries. Some draw distinctions between Christian evangelism and proselytism, regarding proselytism as involuntary or coerced; the two terms can also be understood to merely be synonyms.

== Etymology ==
The English-language word proselytize derives from the Greek language prefix προσ- (pros-, "toward") and the verb ἔρχομαι (érchomai, "I come") in the form of προσήλυτος (prosélytos, "newcomer"). Historically, in the Koine Greek Septuagint and New Testament, the word proselyte denoted a Gentile who was considering conversion to Judaism. Although the word proselytism originally referred to converting to Judaism (and earlier related to Gentiles such as God-fearers), it now implies an attempt of any religion or religious individuals to convert people to their belief.

Arthur J. Serratelli, the Catholic Bishop of Paterson, New Jersey, observed that the meaning of the word proselytism has changed over time.

[O]riginally, the Greek Septuagint translation of the Old Testament passed the word 'proselyte' into modern languages with a neutral meaning. It simply meant a convert, someone who changed his or her opinion or religion. And, proselytism meant the attempt to persuade someone to make such a change. But, today proselytism is almost universally seen as a sinister activity when it comes to religious beliefs.

The World Council of Churches has indicated that, when used pejoratively, proselytism refers to attempts at conversion by "unjust means that violate the conscience of the human person", such as by coercion or bribery.

== Right and limits ==
The right to change religion and to manifest religion is protected under Article 18 of the International Covenant on Civil and Political Rights.

Limitations on proselytism have been considered as infringements on freedom of religion, freedom of speech and as authoritarian.

== By faith ==
The religions of the world can be divided into two groups: those that actively seek new followers (missionary religions like Christianity) and those that do not (non-missionary religions). This classification dates back to a lecture given by Max Müller in 1873 and is based on whether or not a religion seeks to gain new converts. The three main religions classified as missionary religions are Nichiren Buddhism of Japan, Christianity, and Islam, while the non-missionary religions include Judaism, Zoroastrianism, Hinduism & most of Buddhism. Other religions, such as Primal Religions, Confucianism, and Taoism, may also be considered non-missionary religions.

=== Baháʼí Faith ===
In the writings of the Baháʼí Faith, the endeavour to attract people to the religion is strongly emphasized. The process of attracting people to the religion is referred to as teaching. The term proselytism is given the connotation of aggressively teaching the religion to others – as such, Bahaʼi proselytism is prohibited.

Every Bahaʼi is obligated to teach their religion, as it is seen as the path toward bringing peace and justice to the world. Some Bahaʼis become pioneers, moving to countries or cities where there are a small number of Bahaʼis, with the aim of helping to spread the religion. Some other Bahaʼis move from place to place in a process called travel teaching. When moving or travelling to other countries, Bahaʼis are encouraged to integrate into their new society and apply Bahaʼis principles in living and working with their neighbours. However, only a small minority of Bahaʼis are directly teaching their religion to others. Despite this, as of 2010, the religion had grown "at least twice as fast as the population of almost every UN region" over the previous 100 years.

Bahá'u'lláh, the founder of the Bahaʼi Faith, wrote that those who would be teaching his religion should emphasize the importance of ethics and wisdom, and he counselled Bahaʼis to be unrestrained and put their trust in God. At the same time, he stated that Bahaʼis should exercise moderation, tact, and wisdom and not be too aggressive in their teaching. In sharing their faith with others, Bahaʼis are cautioned to ensure the person they are proposing to teach is open to hearing what they say. In most countries, becoming a Bahaʼi is simply filling out a card stating a declaration of belief. This includes acknowledgement of Bahá'u'llah as the messenger of God for this age, awareness and acceptance of his teachings, and intention to be obedient to the institutions and laws he established. It does not involve negating one's previous beliefs due to the Bahaʼi belief in progressive revelation.

=== Christianity ===
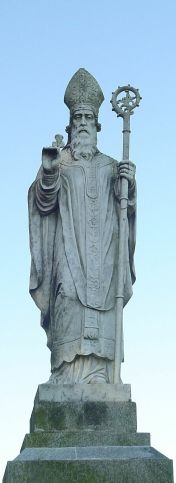
Statue of St. Patrick of the Celtic Church, who was famous for proselytizing

Many Christians consider it their obligation to follow what is often termed the Great Commission in the final verses of the Gospel of Matthew: "Go ye therefore, and teach all nations, baptizing them in the name of the Father, and of the Son, and of the Holy Spirit: Teaching them to observe all things whatsoever I have commanded you: and, lo, I am with you always, even unto the end of the world. Amen." The Acts of the Apostles and other sources contain several accounts of early Christians following this directive by engaging in individual conversations and mass sermons to spread the Good News.

Most self-described Christian groups have organizations devoted to missionary work, which in whole or in part includes proselytism of the non-religious and people of other faiths (including sometimes other variants of Christianity). Jehovah's Witnesses and the Church of Jesus Christ of Latter-day Saints are known in particular for their doctrinal emphasis on proselytizing.

The Moscow Patriarchate has repeatedly strongly condemned what it describes as Catholic proselytism of Orthodox Christians within Russia and has therefore opposed a Catholic construction project in an area of Russia where the Catholic community is small. The Catholic Church claims that it is supporting the existing Catholic community within Russia and is not proselytizing. In 1993 the Balamand declaration on proselytism was released between the Roman Catholic Church and Orthodox Churches.

The Catholic Church in Ad gentes states that "The Church strictly forbids forcing anyone to embrace the Faith, or alluring or enticing people by worrisome wiles."

The World Council of Churches in The Challenge of Proselytism and the Calling to Common Witness states the following:

19. Proselytism as described in this document stands in opposition to all ecumenical effort. It includes certain activities which often aim at having people change their church affiliation and which we believe must be avoided, such as the following:

- making unjust or uncharitable references to other churches' beliefs and practices and even ridiculing them;
- comparing two Christian communities by emphasizing the achievements and ideals of one, and the weaknesses and practical problems of the other;
- employing any kind of physical violence, moral compulsion and psychological pressure e.g. the use of certain advertising techniques in mass media that might bring undue pressure on readers/viewers;
- using political, social and economic power as a means of winning new members for one's own church;
- extending explicit or implicit offers of education, health care or material inducements or using financial resources with the intent of making converts;
- manipulative attitudes and practices that exploit people's needs, weaknesses or lack of education especially in situations of distress, and fail to respect their freedom and human dignity.

==== Muggletonians ====
The Muggletonians, founded by John Reeve and Lodowick Muggleton in mid-17th century London, believed that if a person were exposed to the full tenets of their faith and rejected it, they would be irretrievably damned. This risk tempered proselytization: they hesitated to expose people to loss of salvation, which may explain their low numbers. In the mid-19th century, two wealthy Muggletonians, Joseph and Isaac Frost, broke with this cautious approach and published several books about the faith.

=== Indian religions ===
Buddhist proselytism at the time of king Ashoka (260–218 BC), according to the Edicts of Ashoka

==== Buddhism ====
Buddhism has no accepted or strong proselytism tradition, with the Buddha teaching his followers to respect other religions and the clergy. Emperor Ashoka, however, sent imperial missionaries to various kingdoms and sent his son and daughter as missionaries to Sri Lanka following his conversion to Buddhism. Aggressive proselytizing is discouraged in the major Buddhist schools and Buddhists do not engage in the practice of proselytization.

Some adherents of Nichiren Buddhism proselytise in a process called shakubuku.

The Dalai Lama has critiqued proselytization and certain types of conversion, believing the practices to be contrary to the fundamental ideas of religious harmony and spiritual practice. He has stated that "It's very important that our religious traditions live in harmony with one another and I don't think proselytizing contributes to this. Just as fighting and killing in the name of religion are very sad, it's not appropriate to use religion as a ground or a means for defeating others." In particular, he has critiqued Christian approaches to conversion in Asia, stating that he has "come across situations where serving the people is a cover for proselytization." The Dalai Lama has labeled such practices counter to the "message of Christ" and has emphasized that such individuals "practice conversion like a kind of war against peoples and cultures." In a statement with Hindu religious leaders, he expressed that he opposes "conversions by any religious tradition using various methods of enticement."

==== Hinduism ====
Hinduism has a proselytism tradition. Classical Hinduism represents a diversity of views and theology. Its followers are free to follow any among the theistic, non-theistic or other traditions within Hinduism. Followers can pick or change to any philosophy or belief they fancy and worship any personal god or goddess in a manner they deem fit, given an unspoken but loud understanding that all paths are equally valid in their purest form. Religious conversion from and to Hinduism has been controversial in the modern era. Many state the concept of missionary activity and proselytism is anathema to the precepts of Hinduism.

While proselytism was not a part of the Hindu tradition, religious conversion to and between various traditions within Hinduism, such as Vaishnavism, Shaivism, and Shaktism, has a long history. However, these traditions of conversion did not have to do with an idea that was more objectively valid or the potential consequences of false ideas in the afterlife, but which was more conducive to understanding the unknowable Brahman and promoting righteousness throughout society.

The debate on proselytization and religious conversion between Christianity, Islam, and Hinduism is more recent and started in the 19th century. Religious leaders of some Hindu reform movements such as the Arya Samaj launched the Shuddhi movement to proselytize and reconvert Muslims and Christians back to Hinduism, while those such as the Brahmo Samaj suggested Hinduism to be a non-missionary religion. All these sects of Hinduism have welcomed new members to their group, while other leaders of Hinduism's diverse schools have stated that given the intensive proselytization activities from missionary Islam and Christianity, this "there is no such thing as proselytism in Hinduism" view must be re-examined.

==== Hare Krishna Movement ====
One group that takes in willing converts in Hinduism is the International Society for Krishna Consciousness (ISKCON), also known as Hare Krishnas. Devotees have no codified conversion rituals but promote recitation of the Hare Krishna mantra as a means to achieve a mature stage of love of God. ISKCON adherents view Krishna as the supreme deity that those of other faith traditions worship. A commonly accepted notion among devotees is that ISKCON allows one to recognize the primacy of the supreme deity, Krishna, in the practices and traditions of other faiths. ISKCON promotes the concept of Sanatana-Dharma (Hinduism), the 'eternal law' that other faiths can uncover.

==== Jainism ====
Mahavira (599–527 BC), the 24th Tirthankara of Jainism, developed an early philosophy regarding relativism and subjectivism known as Anekantavada. As a result of this acceptance of alternative religious practices, the phenomenon of proselytization is largely absent in these religions but not unknown. Converts are welcome to the Jain faith.

==== Sikhism ====
Sikhism is not a proselytizing religion and proselytism is largely discouraged "through force or inducement" out of the belief that each person has a fundamental right to practice their religion freely.

=== Islam ===
In Islam, inviting people to the religion is meritorious. The Quran states,

There is no compulsion in the religion. The truth stands clear from error. Whoever rejects falsehood and believes in Allah has grasped a firm hand-hold that will never break, for Allah hears and knows (all things). Al-Baqara 256

The operative phrase /lā ikrāha fī d-dīni/ literally translates as "there is to be no compulsion in religion." "Ikrāh" is the gerund attached to the verb "akraha," among whose meanings is "he compelled (another to do something he hates doing)." Muslim scholars consider this passage to mean that force is not to be used to convert someone to Islam. Muslims consider inviting others to Islam to be the mission originally carried out by the prophets of Allah and is now a collective duty of Muslims. The Quran states,

Invite (others) to the way of your Lord with wisdom and beautiful preaching, and reason with them in ways that are best. Your Lord knows best who is straying from His path and who is being guided (towards it). Al Nahl ('The Bees', 16:125)

Here, the operative phrase /udʿu ilà sabīli rabbika/ "Invite (command to a single male subject) to the way of your Lord" expresses the element direction /ilà/ "to" that is missing in 'The Cow', 2:256.

Some interpretations of Sharia have forbidden non-Muslims from proselytising to Muslims.

=== Judaism ===
An important tenet of Judaism is that God's will allows people to exercise free will. As such, proselytizing is generally regarded as offensive in Judaism. Consequently, Judaism does typically not proselytize non-Jews. Instead, non-Jews are encouraged to follow the Seven Laws of Noah, assuring them a place in the world to come. In ancient times, these observant non-Jews could become geirim toshvim, a term still sometimes used informally to refer to those who strive to follow these laws and who will join the Jewish people in the world to come. A non-Jew who follows Noahide law is considered to believe in Noahidism; for this end, there is some minor outreach by Orthodox Jewish organizations.

Generally, Jews expect any convert to Judaism to come through their own accord. A common source of converts are those who intend to marry a Jewish person, but many join for spiritual or other personal reasons; these people are called "Jews by choice". Rabbis will often initially discourage conversion, but will provide guidance through courses or personal meetings for those who are truly interested. Orthodox Judaism in theory neither encourages nor discourages conversion. Standards for conversion can be very challenging, but rabbis will acquiesce to persistent and sincere requests for conversion. Much emphasis is placed on gaining a Jewish identity.

Although most Jewish organizations do not proselytize, Chabad practices Orthodox Judaism outreach to halachic Jews who are not observant.

=== Inherited membership ===
Sects of some religions, such as the Druze, Yazidis, and Yarsans, do not accept converts at all.

== See also ==
- Apostasy
- Fate of the unlearned
- Freedom of religion
- List of proselytes
- Religious conversion

== References and sources ==
Sources

- C. Davis (1996). "Joining a Cult: Religious Choice or Psychological Aberration?". Cleveland-Marshall Journal of Law and Health. 11.
- "Russian Canonical Territory". Archived from the original on 2 October 2013.
- "Human Rights Without Frontiers Int". European Court Final Judgments on Religious Freedom Issues 1964–2001. Archived from the original on 20 June 2006.
- Van Biema, David (3 October 2008). "YouTube Gets Religion". Time. Archived from the original on 8 October 2008.
- "Rabbi Asher Meza's Jewish outreach organization". BeJewish.org.
- Yahiya Emerick. "The Holy Qur'an in Today's English", ISBN 978-1451506914
