= Joseph Arthur Costello =

Catholic bishop (1915–1978)

Most Reverend Joseph A. Costello
- Auxiliary Bishop of Newark
- Church: Catholic Church
- See: Titular See of Choma
- Appointed: November 17, 1962
- In office: January 24, 1963 - September 22, 1978

Orders
- Ordination: June 7, 1941
- Consecration: January 24, 1963 by Thomas Aloysius Boland

Personal details
- Born: May 9, 1915 Newark, New Jersey
- Died: September 22, 1978 (aged 63)

Joseph Arthur Costello (May 9, 1915 – September 22, 1978) was a Roman Catholic bishop of the Catholic Church in the United States who served as an auxiliary bishop of the Archdiocese of Newark, New Jersey from 1963 to 1978.

== Biography ==
Born in Newark, New Jersey, Joseph Costello was ordained a priest for the Archdiocese of Newark on June 7, 1941.

On November 17, 1962 Pope John XXIII appointed Costello as the Titular Bishop of ‘’Choma’’ and Auxiliary Bishop of Newark. He was consecrated a bishop by Archbishop Thomas Boland on January 24, 1963. The principal co-consecrators were Bishop James McNulty of Paterson and Newark Auxiliary Bishop Martin Stanton.

Costello attended three of the four sessions of the Second Vatican Council (1962-1965). He continued to serve as an auxiliary bishop until his death at the age of 63 on September 22, 1978.
