= John Joseph Dougherty =

Catholic bishop (1907–1986)

Most Reverend John J. Dougherty
- Auxiliary Bishop of Newark
- Church: Catholic Church
- See: Titular See of Cotenna
- Appointed: November 17, 1962
- In office: January 24, 1963 – September 18, 1982

Orders
- Ordination: July 23, 1933
- Consecration: January 24, 1963 by Thomas Aloysius Boland

Personal details
- Born: September 16, 1907 Jersey City, New Jersey
- Died: March 20, 1986 (aged 78)

John Joseph Dougherty (September 16, 1907 – March 20, 1986) was a bishop of the Catholic Church in the United States. He served as an auxiliary bishop of the Archdiocese of Newark from 1963 to 1982. He was president of Seton Hall University from 1959 to 1969.

== Biography ==
Born in Jersey City, New Jersey, John Dougherty was ordained a priest for the Archdiocese of Newark on July 23, 1933.

On November 17, 1962 Pope John XXIII appointed him as the Titular Bishop of Cotenna and Auxiliary Bishop of Newark. He was consecrated a bishop by Archbishop Thomas Boland on January 24, 1963. The principal co-consecrators were Bishop James McNulty of Paterson and Newark Auxiliary Bishop Martin Stanton.

Dougherty attended two of the four sessions of the Second Vatican Council (1962–1965). He continued to serve as an auxiliary bishop until his resignation was accepted by Pope John Paul II on September 18, 1982.

He died at the age of 78 on March 20, 1986.

Catholic Church titles
Preceded by –	Auxiliary Bishop of Newark, New Jersey; 1963-1982	Succeeded by –
