= Thomas H. McLaughlin =

Catholic bishop (1881–1947)

His Excellency, The Most Reverend Thomas Henry McLaughlin
- Bishop of Paterson; Titular Bishop of Nisa in Lycia
- Church: Roman Catholic Church
- See: Diocese of Paterson
- Successor: Thomas Aloysius Boland
- Other posts: Auxiliary Bishop of Newark (1935 to 1937); Titular Bishop of Nisa in Lycia

Orders
- Ordination: July 26, 1904 by Balthasar Kaltner
- Consecration: July 25, 1935 by Thomas J. Walsh

Personal details
- Born: July 25, 1881 New York City, US
- Died: March 17, 1947 (aged 65)
- Education: University of Innsbruck

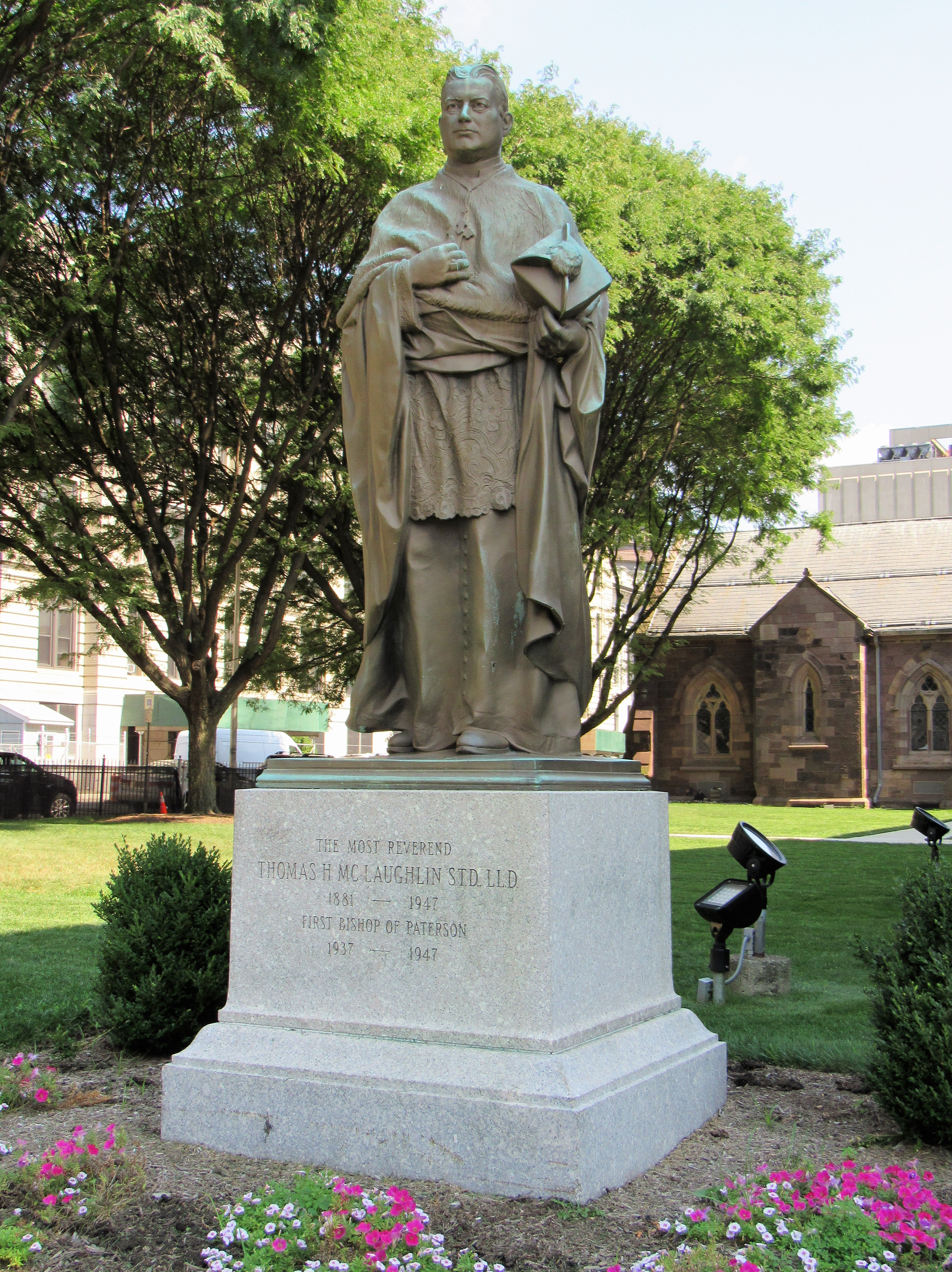
Statue and grave of Bishop McLaughlin at St. John the Baptist Cathedral, Paterson, New Jersey (2018)

Thomas Henry McLaughlin (July 25, 1881 – March 17, 1947) was an American prelate of the Roman Catholic Church who served as president of Seton Hall College from 1922 to 1933 and as the first bishop of the new Diocese of Paterson in New Jersey from 1937 until his death in 1947.

McLaughlin previously served as an auxiliary bishop of the Diocese of Newark in New Jersey from 1935 to 1937

== Biography ==
=== Early life ===
Thomas McLaughlin was born on July 25, 1881, in New York City to John and Margaret (née Byrne) McLaughlin. His family later moved to Montclair, New Jersey.

McLaughlin attended St. Francis Xavier College in New York City, obtaining a Bachelor of Arts degree in 1901. He then went to the University of Innsbruck in Innsbruck, Austria.

=== Priesthood ===
McLaughlin was ordained to the priesthood in Innsbruck for the Diocese of Newark by Bishop Balthasar Kaltner on July 26, 1904. McLaughlin earned a doctorate in sacred theology from Innsbruck in 1908.

Returning to New Jersey, McLaughlin was appointed a professor at Seton Hall College at South Orange in 1908. He served as dean from 1914 until 1922, when he was elected president of Seton Hall and rector of Immaculate Conception Seminary. He remained as president until 1933 and rector until 1938. He was named a domestic prelate by the Vatican in 1923, and appointed vicar general of the archdiocese in 1933.

=== Auxiliary Bishop of Newark ===
On May 18, 1935, McLaughlin was appointed as an auxiliary bishop of Newark and Titular Bishop of Nisa in Lycia by Pope Pius XI. He received his episcopal consecration on July 25, 1935, from Archbishop Thomas J. Walsh, with Bishops John A. Duffy and Joseph H. Schlarman serving as co-consecrators.

=== Bishop of Paterson ===
Pius XI named McLaughlin as the first bishop of the newly erected Diocese of Paterson on December 16, 1937.He designated St. John the Baptist Church in Patterson as the cathedral. Thomas McLaughlin remained as bishop of Paterson until his death on March 17, 1947. He is buried at St. John the Baptist Cathedral Churchyard in Paterson.

=== Relationship to Blessed Miriam Teresa Demjanovich ===
McLaughlin's brother Paul McLaughlin was married to Anna Demjanovich, sister of Blessed Miriam Teresa Demjanovich and Monsignor Charles Demjanovich.

Catholic Church titles
Preceded by –	Auxiliary Bishop of Newark; July 25, 1935 – December 16, 1937	Succeeded by –
Preceded by none	Bishop of Paterson; December 16, 1937 – March 17, 1947	Succeeded by Thomas Aloysius Boland
