= Kodopa =

Kodopa (Ancient Greek: Κόδοπα) was a town of ancient Lycia, which per the Stadiasmus Patarensis was the destination of a road from Choma.
