= Lawrence Casey =

Lawrence Casey may refer to:

- Lawrence B. Casey, American prelate of the Roman Catholic Church
- Lawrence P. Casey, American film and television actor

== See also ==
- Casey Lawrence, American baseball pitcher
