= Thomas Aloysius Boland =

American prelate (1896–1979)

His Excellency, The Most Reverend Thomas Aloysius Boland
- Archbishop of Newark; Titular Bishop of Hirina
- See: Archdiocese of Newark
- Installed: January 14, 1953
- Term ended: April 2, 1974
- Predecessor: Thomas Walsh
- Successor: Peter Leo Gerety
- Previous posts: Auxiliary Bishop of Newark (1940–1947); Bishop of Paterson (1947–1952)

Orders
- Ordination: December 23, 1922 by Basilio Pompilj
- Consecration: July 25, 1940 by Thomas Walsh

Personal details
- Born: February 17, 1896 Orange, New Jersey, US
- Died: March 16, 1979 (aged 83) Orange, New Jersey
- Denomination: Roman Catholic Church
- Education: Seton Hall College; Pontifical Urbaniana University

Styles of Thomas Aloysius Boland
- Reference style: The Most Reverend
- Spoken style: Your Excellency
- Religious style: Monsignor
- Posthumous style: none

Ordination history of Thomas Aloysius Boland
History
Episcopal consecration
- Consecrated by: Thomas Walsh (Newark)
Episcopal succession
Bishops consecrated by Thomas Aloysius Boland as principal consecrator
- Justin J. McCarthy: June 11, 1954
- Walter William Curtis: September 24, 1957
- Martin Walter Stanton: September 24, 1957
- Joseph Arthur Costello: January 24, 1963
- John Joseph Dougherty: January 24, 1963
- John Edward Cohill, S.V.D.: March 11, 1967

Thomas Aloysius Boland (February 17, 1896 – March 16, 1979) was an American prelate of the Roman Catholic Church. He served as archbishop of the Archdiocese of Newark in New Jersey from 1952 to 1974. He previously served as an auxiliary bishop of the same diocese from 1940 to 1947 and bishop of the Diocese of Paterson in New Jersey from 1947 to 1952.

== Biography ==
=== Early life ===
Thomas Boland was born on February 17, 1896, in Orange, New Jersey, to John Peter and Ellen Agnes (née O'Rourke) Boland. He received his early education at the St. John's School, the parish school of St. John the Evangelist Parish in Orange He then attended St. Francis Xavier High School in New York City.

In 1915, Boland enrolled at Seton Hall College in South Orange, New Jersey. He graduated from Seton Hall in 1919 as valedictorian of his class. He then began his studies for the priesthood at the Pontifical North American College in Rome. He earned a Doctor of Sacred Theology degree from the Pontifical Urbaniana University.

=== Priesthood ===
On December 23, 1922, Boland was ordained by Cardinal Basilio Pompilj as a priest of what was then the Diocese of Newark. The ordination took place in Rome at the Basilica of St. John Lateran. Following his return to New Jersey, the archdiocese assigned Walsh as s a curate at St. Catherine's Parish in Hillside. He also served at St. Mary's Parish in Nutley. New Jersey. In addition to his pastoral duties, Boland taught sacred scripture and classical languages at Seton Hall Preparatory School and Seton Hall College.

From 1926 to 1938, Boland served as professor of moral theology and canon law at Immaculate Conception Seminary in Darlington, New Jersey. In 1933, he became an official of the archdiocesan tribunal with the duty of adjudicating marriages with validity issues. That same year, he was named moderator of the priests' conferences. Boland was appointed chancellor of the archdiocese in 1938.

=== Auxiliary Bishop of Newark ===
On May 21, 1940, Boland was appointed as an auxiliary bishop of Newark and titular bishop of Hirina by Pope Pius XII. He received his episcopal consecration on July 25, 1940, from Archbishop Thomas Walsh, with Bishops William A. Griffin and Bartholomew J. Eustace serving as co-consecrators.

As an auxiliary bishop, Boland served as rector of Immaculate Conception Seminary from 1940 to 1947. In this capacity, he taught pastoral theology and liturgy and lectured on the archdiocesan statutes. He also served as director of the Newark branch of the National Organization for Decent Literature, and as promoter of the archdiocesan synod held in 1941.

=== Bishop of Paterson ===
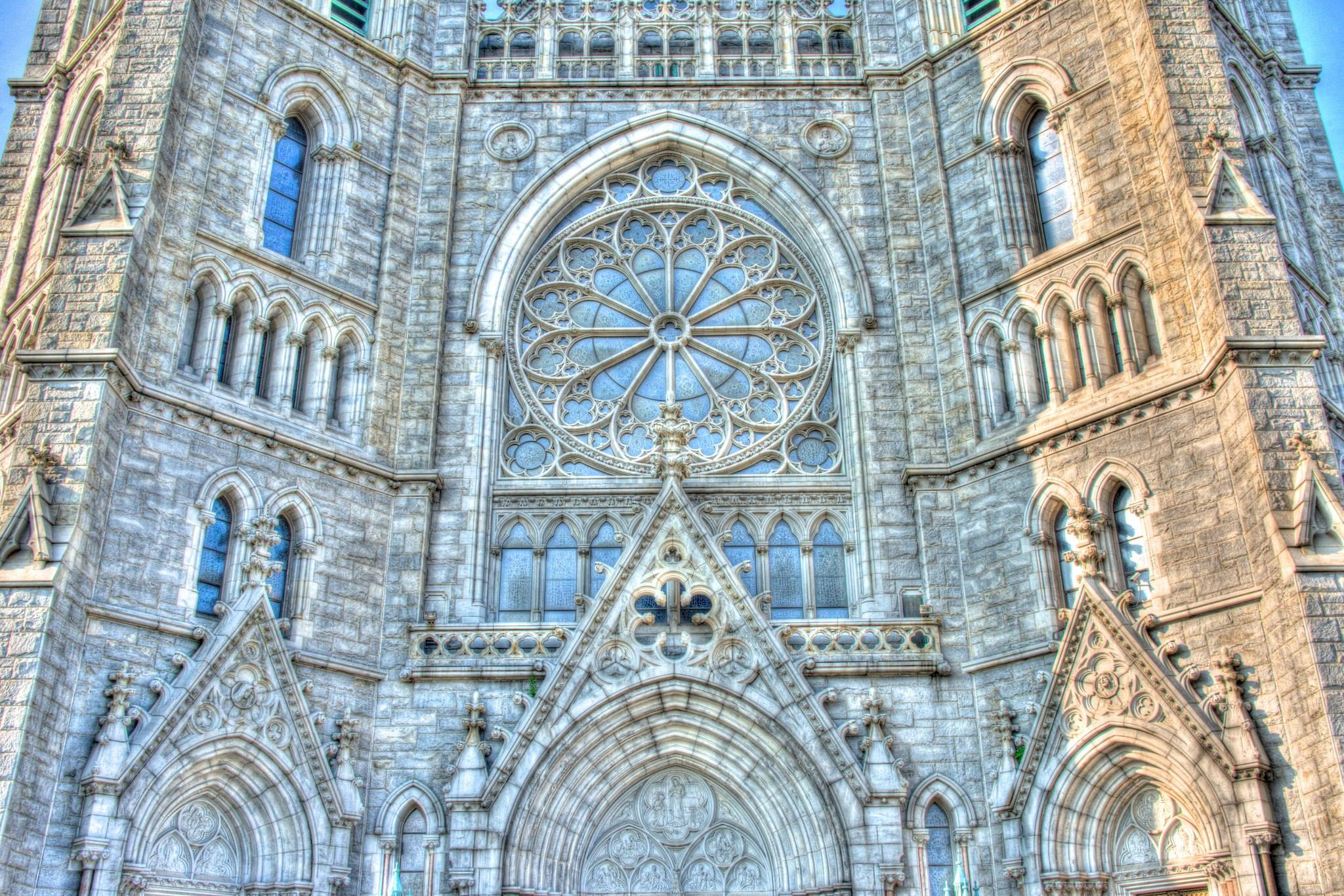
Cathedral of the Sacred Heart, Newark, New Jersey (2015)

Following the death of Bishop Thomas H. McLaughlin, Boland was named the second bishop of Paterson on June 21, 1947, by Pius XII. His installation took place at the Cathedral of St. John the Baptist in Paterson on September 18, 1947.

=== Archbishop of Newark ===
Boland was appointed the second archbishop of Newark on November 15, 1952. He was installed at Sacred Heart Church in Newark, New Jersey, on January 14, 1953. On October 19, 1954, he formally dedicated the Cathedral of the Sacred Heart in Newark. At the same ceremony, he received the pallium, a vestment worn by metropolitan bishops, from Archbishop Amleto Cicognani, the apostolic delegate to the United States.

In 1960, Immaculate Heart Academy, the first regional high schools for girls in the archdiocese, was founded in Washington Township, New Jersey by the Sisters of St. Joseph of Peace. In 1962, the Xavierian Brothers founded St. Joseph Regional High School in Montvale, New Jersey, Paramus Catholic High School in Paramus, New opened during the same time period

Between 1962 and 1965, Boland attended all four sessions of the Second Vatican Council in Rome, where he was elected to head the Bishops' Study Committee. In June 1965, he was named an assistant at the pontifical throne by Pope Paul VI for "establishing numerous parishes, opening many parochial schools and admitting the laity to active participation in the apostolate of the sacred ecclesiastical hierarchy." He was also a member of the Catholic Mission Board of the United States, chair of the Episcopal Committee, and liaison between women religious and the American Catholic bishops.

In January 1969, a group of 20 priests of the archdiocese accused Boland of adopting a "white racist attitude" toward African Americans and said he must be charged with;

"...the bigotry of indolence and the prejudice of apathy." Along with these accusations of racism, the group of priests presented a list of demands, which called for the formation of an advisory committee of priests for inner-city affairs, an improved method of screening priests in African American areas, and the transfer of some pastors who have "not proven a predisposition for justice by their performance."

In response, Boland issued a seven-page report that outlined the programs the archdiocese had taken in regard to African-Americans. He declared,

"No one can truthfully say I have not made every effort to bring to reality those plans which I have felt could be of advantage, whether for spiritual or temporal goals, of the disadvantaged in our midst.

== Retirement and legacy ==
Boland's resignation as archbishop of Newark was accepted by Pope Paul VI on April 2, 1974. Thomas Boland died at St. Mary's Hospital in Orange on March 16, 1979, at age 83. He was buried in the crypt of the Cathedral of the Sacred Heart.

Catholic Church titles
| Preceded by – | Auxiliary Bishop of Newark; July 25, 1940 – June 21, 1947 | Succeeded by – |
| Preceded by Thomas Henry McLaughlin | Bishop of Paterson; June 21, 1947 – November 15, 1952 | Succeeded by James Aloysius McNulty |
| Preceded by Thomas Joseph Walsh | Archbishop of Newark; November 15, 1952 – March 25, 1974 | Succeeded by Peter Leo Gerety |
