= Arthur J. Serratelli =

American prelate (born 1944)

His Excellency, The Most Reverend Arthur Joseph Serratelli
- Bishop Emeritus of Paterson titular bishop of Enera
- Church: Catholic Church
- See: Diocese of Paterson
- Appointed: June 1, 2004
- Installed: July 6, 2004
- Retired: 15 April 2020
- Predecessor: Frank Joseph Rodimer
- Successor: Kevin J. Sweeney
- Previous post: Auxiliary Bishop of Newark and Titular Bishop of Enera (2000-2004)

Orders
- Ordination: December 20, 1968 by Francis Frederick Reh
- Consecration: September 8, 2000 by Theodore Edgar McCarrick, Michael Angelo Saltarelli, and Paul Gregory Bootkoski

Personal details
- Born: April 18, 1944 (age 82) Newark, New Jersey, US
- Motto: Vivere Christus est (To live is Christ)

Styles of Arthur Joseph Serratelli
- Reference style: His Excellency; The Most Reverend
- Spoken style: Your Excellency
- Religious style: Bishop

Arthur Joseph Serratelli (born April 18, 1944) is an American prelate of the Roman Catholic Church. He served as bishop of the Diocese of Paterson in New Jersey from 2004 to 2020 and as an auxiliary bishop for the Archdiocese of Newark in New Jersey between 2000 and 2004.

== Biography ==
=== Early life ===
Arthur Serratelli was born on April 18, 1944, in Newark, New Jersey to Pio Serratelli and Eva Fasolino. He was a member of Our Lady of Mount Carmel Parish in the Ironbound section of Newark. For primary school, Serratelli attended the Ann Street Parish School and Our Lady of Mt. Carmel Parish school, both in Newark.

Serratelli graduated from Seton Hall Preparatory School in West Orange, New Jersey, in 1961. He then attended Seton Hall University in South Orange, New Jersey for two years, then transferred to the Immaculate Conception Seminary School of Theology at the university. After two years of philosophy studies, Serratelli continued his studies in Rome at the Pontifical Gregorian University, residing at the Pontifical North American College.

=== Priestly ministry ===
On December 20, 1968, Serratelli was ordained by Bishop Francis Reh for the priesthood for the Archdiocese of Newark in St. Peter's Basilica in Rome. For the next year, Serratelli served as parochial vicar at St. Anthony Parish in Belleville, New Jersey. For two years he taught Systematic Theology at Immaculate Conception Seminary. Serratelli then returned to Rome for graduate study, earning his Licentiate of Sacred Theology (1969) and Doctor of Sacred Theology degree (1977).

In 1977, Serratelli returned to Immaculate Conception Seminary, where he taught sacred scripture and biblical languages until 2000. In 1997, he was also named rector of St. Andrew’s College Seminary at Seton Hall University, serving there from 1997 to 2000. Serratelli also taught at the Mount St. Alphonsus Seminary in Esopus, New York; St. Joseph’s Seminary in Yonkers, New York; the Institute of Religious Studies, Archdiocese of New York; and the lay ministry program of the Educational Program Service of Trinity Washington University in Washington, D.C. Pope John Paul II named Serratelli a prelate of honor in 1998.

While serving in the archdiocese, Serratelli belonged to the following consultative bodies:

- College of Consultors
- Commission for the Men's Apostolate
- Finance Council
- Presbyteral Council
- Priestly Vocations Board.

=== Auxiliary Bishop of Newark ===
On July 3, 2000, John Paul II named Serratelli as an auxiliary bishop of Newark and titular bishop of Enera. He was consecrated on September 8, 2000, by then future Cardinal Theodore McCarrick, with co-consecrating Bishops Michael Saltarelli and Paul Bootkoski. After his consecration, Serratelli was appointed vicar for Essex County, New Jersey. He was later appointed the archdiocesan vicar general.

=== Bishop of Paterson ===
On June 1, 2004, John Paul II accepted the retirement of Bishop Frank J. Rodimer as bishop of Paterson and appointed Serratelli as his successor. Serratelli was installed on July 6, 2004, at the Cathedral of Saint John the Baptist in Paterson, New Jersey.

On Feb 24, 2005, Serratelli and the Diocese of Paterson settled a $5 million lawsuit with four parishioners. It involved two former priests in Mendham Township, New Jersey, two priests in Paterson, a clergymen in Clifton, New Jersey, and a former deacon in Dover, New Jersey. One of the plaintiff lawyers credited Serratelli with expediting the settlement.

As a member of the United States Conference of Catholic Bishops (USCCB), Serratelli as of 2012 was chair of the Committee on Doctrine's Subcommittee for the Review of Scripture Translations, and a member of the Committee on Divine Worship and its Task Groups on Liturgy with Children, and the Review of the Lectionary. Previously, Serratelli served as chair of the Committee on Liturgy (later the Committee on Divine Worship) from 2007 to 2010, and was responsible for announcing the acceptance by the Vatican of changes to the English translation of the Roman Missal.. Serratelli was also a member of the Ad Hoc Committee for the Review of the Catechism, the Ad Hoc Committee for the Spanish Bible for the Church in America, the Board of Bishops for the American College of Louvain, and the Committee for Women in the Church and Society.

Serratelli was a board or trustee member of:

- New Jersey Catholic Conference
- Assumption College for Sisters in Mendham Borough, New Jersey
- College of St. Elizabeth in Morris Township, New Jersey
- Seton Hall University
- Immaculate Conception Seminary.

Serratelli served as the chair of the International Commission on English in the Liturgy, and the Catholic co-chair, together with the Baptist theologian Paul Fiddes, of the International Theological Consultation between Catholics and Baptists. Pope Francis appointed Serratelli a member of the Congregation for Divine Worship and the Discipline of the Sacraments on October 28, 2016. In February 2019, the dioceses of New Jersey released a list of priests and deacons who had been credibly accused of sexual abuse. Eleven priests came from the Diocese of Paterson. Serratelli made this statement:

If you have been a victim of sexual abuse, my prayers and heart go out to you for this horrible action which has been committed against you. I pray for your healing and, on behalf of myself, our diocese and the Catholic Church, I deeply and sincerely apologize for the pain that you have endured.

=== Retirement ===
Having reached the mandatory retirement age of 75, Serratelli submitted his resignation as bishop of Paterson, which Pope Francis accepted on April 15, 2020. Serratelli served as apostolic administrator of the Diocese of Paterson until his successor was installed.

== Coats of arms ==
Serratelli's coat of arms was developed with imagery from his Italian heritage, his identity as a priest of the Archdiocese of Newark, his studies in scripture and his honoring both Pope John Paul II and McCarrick.

Catholic Church titles
Preceded by Frank Joseph Rodimer	Bishop of Paterson; July 6, 2004 – April 15, 2020	Succeeded by Kevin J. Sweeney
Preceded by Raúl Omar Rossi	Titular Bishop of Enera; September 8, 2000 – June 1, 2004	Succeeded by Dennis Joseph Sullivan
