= Kevin J. Sweeney =

American Catholic bishop (born 1970)

His Excellency, The Most Reverend Kevin J. Sweeney
- Bishop of Paterson
- See: Diocese of Paterson
- Appointed: April 15, 2020
- Installed: July 1, 2020
- Predecessor: Arthur J. Serratelli

Orders
- Ordination: June 28, 1997 by Thomas Vose Daily
- Consecration: July 1, 2020 by Joseph W. Tobin, Arthur J. Serratelli, and Nicholas Anthony DiMarzio

Personal details
- Born: January 10, 1970 (age 56) Queens, New York, US
- Education: Cathedral Seminary; St. John's University; Seminary of the Immaculate Conception
- Motto: Dios es amor ("God is love")

Styles of Kevin J. Sweeney
- Reference style: His Excellency; The Most Reverend
- Spoken style: Your Excellency
- Religious style: Bishop

Kevin J. Sweeney is an American prelate of the Catholic Church who has been serving as bishop of the Diocese of Paterson in New Jersey since 2020.

== Biography ==
=== Early life and education ===
A native of the New York borough of Queens, Kevin Sweeney was born on January 10, 1970, to James and Agnes (Blewitt) Sweeney. He has a sister, Marie Shanahan, and a brother, Brendan. Kevin Sweeney grew up in St. Luke's Parish in Whitestone, Queens, and attended Cathedral Preparatory School and Seminary in Queens from 1984 to 1988. Sweeney played on the school baseball team; he entered the Cathedral Prep hall of fame in 2013.

Deciding that he wanted to become a priest, Sweeney entered the Cathedral Seminary in Douglaston, New York. He then enrolled at St. John's University in New York City, where he earned a Bachelor of Arts degree in philosophy in 1992.

After finishing at St. John's, Sweeney continued his studies at Seminary of the Immaculate Conception in Huntington, New York. During his time at the seminary, Sweeney spent a pastoral year at St. Agatha's Parish in Brooklyn . Sweeney was awarded a Master of Divinity degree in theology in 1997

=== Ordination and ministry ===
On June 28, 1997, Sweeney was ordained a priest at the Cathedral Basilica of St. James in Brooklyn for the Diocese of Brooklyn by Bishop Thomas V. Daily. After his 1997 ordination, the diocese assigned Sweeney as parochial vicar at the following parishes in Queens:

- St. Nicholas of Tolentine in Jamaica (1997 to 2003)
- Our Lady of Sorrows in Corona (2003 to 2004)

In 2004, Bishop Nicholas DiMarzio named Sweeney as vocations director, a position he held until 2010. During this time, he also served as the first director of the Pope John Paul II House of Discernment in Brooklyn. Sweeney was named as chaplain in 2005 at Bishop Loughlin Memorial High School in Brooklyn and spiritual director at Jovenes de Valor, a Catholic youth movement in the diocese.

In January 2010, Sweeney was appointed pastor of St. Michael's Parish in Brooklyn's Sunset Park section, a post he held until 2020. He was also named dean of the Brooklyn 8 Deanery in 2013.

=== Bishop of Paterson ===
Pope Francis appointed Sweeney as bishop of Paterson on April 15, 2020. He was consecrated at the Cathedral of Saint John the Baptist in Paterson by Cardinal Joseph W. Tobin on July 1, 2020, with Bishops Arthur J. Serratelli, and Nicholas DiMarzio acting as co-consecrators.Attendance at the ceremony was limited to about 100 people due to restrictions from the COVID-19 pandemic.

== See also ==
- Catholic Church hierarchy
- Catholic Church in the United States
- Historical list of the Catholic bishops of the United States
- List of Catholic bishops of the United States
- Lists of patriarchs, archbishops, and bishops

Catholic Church titles
Preceded by Arthur J. Serratelli	Bishop of Paterson; 2020–present	Succeeded by incumbent
