= Lawrence B. Casey =

American prelate (1905–1977)

His Excellency, The Most Reverend Lawrence Bernard Casey
- Bishop of Paterson; Titular Bishop of Cea
- See: Diocese of Paterson
- Predecessor: James Johnston Navagh
- Successor: Frank Joseph Rodimer
- Other post: Auxiliary Bishop of Rochester

Orders
- Ordination: June 7, 1930 by John Francis O'Hern
- Consecration: May 5, 1954 by Francis Spellman

Personal details
- Born: September 6, 1905 Rochester, New York, US
- Died: June 15, 1977 (aged 71) Paterson, New Jersey, US
- Buried: Calvary Cemetery, Paterson, New Jersey
- Denomination: Roman Catholic
- Parents: Joseph Leo Casey and Agnes Madeline (née Switzer) Casey
- Education: St. Andrew's Preparatory Seminary; St. Bernard's Seminary

Lawrence Bernard Brennan Casey (September 6, 1905 – June 15, 1977) was an American prelate of the Roman Catholic Church. He served as the fifth bishop of the Diocese of Paterson in New Jersey (1966–1977). He previously served as an auxiliary bishop of the Diocese of Rochester in New York (1954-1966).

== Biography ==
=== Early life ===
Lawrence Casey was born on September 6, 1905, in Rochester, New York, to Joseph Leo and Agnes Madeline (née Switzer) Casey. He studied at St. Andrew's Preparatory Seminary from 1919 until 1924, when he entered St. Bernard's Seminary, both in Rochester.

=== Priesthood ===
Casey was ordained to the priesthood for the Diocese of Rochester on June 7, 1930 by Bishop John Francis O’Hern in Rochester. After his ordination, the diocese assigned him as a curate at St. Mary's Parish in Rochester. He then served as secretary to Bishops O'Hern (1932-1933), Edward Mooney (1933-1937), and James E. Kearney (1937-1946). Casey was named rector of Holy Cross Parish in 1946 and of Sacred Heart Cathedral Parish, both in Rochester, in 1952.

=== Auxiliary Bishop of Rochester ===
On February 10, 1953, Casey was appointed auxiliary bishop of Rochester and titular bishop of Cea by Pope Pius XII. He received his episcopal consecration at Sacred Heart Cathedral on May 5, 1953, from Cardinal Francis Spellman, with Bishops Walter Foery and Alexander M. Zaleski serving as co-consecrators.

=== Bishop of Paterson ===
Following the death of Bishop James Navagh, Pope Paul VI named Casey as bishop of Paterson on March 4, 1966. In 1975, Casey became involved in the case of Karen Anne Quinlan, a young woman in a vegetative state being kept alive by a ventilator at a hospital in Denville, New Jersey. Casey supported the parents request to remove her from the ventilator.

Paul VI accepted Casey's resignation as bishop of Paterson on June 13, 1977. Lawrence Casey died of cancer in Paterson just two days later on June 15, 1977, at age 71.

Catholic Church titles
Preceded by Wesceslau Nazareno Ponti, O.F.M. Cap.	Titular Bishop of Cea; May 5, 1953 – March 4, 1966	Succeeded by –
Preceded by –	Auxiliary Bishop of Rochester; May 5, 1953 – March 4, 1966	Succeeded by –
Preceded by James Johnston Navagh	Bishop of Paterson; March 4, 1966 – June 13, 1977	Succeeded by Frank Joseph Rodimer
