= Martin Walter Stanton =

Catholic bishop (1897–1977)

Most Reverend Martin W. Stanton
- Auxiliary Bishop of Newark
- Church: Catholic Church
- See: Titular See of Citium
- Appointed: June 27, 1957
- In office: September 24, 1957 – April 17, 1972

Orders
- Ordination: June 14, 1924
- Consecration: September 24, 1957 by Thomas Aloysius Boland

Personal details
- Born: April 17, 1897 Jersey City, New Jersey
- Died: October 1, 1977 (aged 80)

Martin Walter Stanton (April 17, 1897 – October 1, 1977) was a bishop of the Catholic Church in the United States. He served as an auxiliary bishop of the Archdiocese of Newark from 1957 to 1972.

== Biography ==
Born in Jersey City, New Jersey, Martin Stanton was ordained a priest for the Archdiocese of Newark on June 14, 1924.

On June 27, 1957 Pope Pius XII appointed him as the Titular Bishop of Citium and Auxiliary Bishop of Newark. He was consecrated by Archbishop Thomas Boland on September 24, 1957. The principal co-consecrators were Bishops James McNulty of Paterson and George Ahr of Trenton.

Stanton continued to serve as an auxiliary bishop until his resignation was accepted by Pope Paul VI on April 17, 1972. He died at the age of 80 on October 1, 1977.

Catholic Church titles
| Preceded by – | Auxiliary Bishop of Newark, New Jersey; 1957-1972 | Succeeded by – |
