= Choma (Lycia) =

Place in the interior of ancient Lycia

Coordinates: 36°38′32″N 29°50′10″E

Choma (Ancient Greek: Χῶμα) was a place in the interior of ancient Lycia, according to Pliny on a river Aedesa. Ptolemy places Choma as one of the four cities of the Milyas, and places it near Candyba. The town can be identified with a site near today's village of Hacımusalar in the district of Elmalı.

Several buildings of the ancient city have been excavated and are visible today.

== Bishopric ==
Since it was in the Roman province of Lycia, the bishopric of Choma was a suffragan of the metropolitan see of Myra, the province's capital. The diocese is documented in the Notitiae Episcopatuum of the patriarchate of Constantinople until the 12th century.

The names of three of its bishops are preserved in extant records. Pionius was at the First Council of Constantinople in 381. Eudoxius was at both the Council of Ephesus in 431 during which he played a role of some importance, when he was part of a delegation sent to order John of Antioch to appear before the council assembly and he was at the Council of Chalcedon in 451, where he seems to have arrived late, missing his name in the attendance list of the first two sessions in 451 and joined the other Lycian bishops in 458 in signing a letter to Byzantine Emperor Leo I the Thracian regarding the murder of Proterius of Alexandria.

- Nicolaus was at the Photian Council of Constantinople (879).

No longer a residential bishopric, Choma is today listed by the Catholic Church as a titular see. Since 1933 Coma has been counted among the bishopric holders of the Catholic Church; the title has not been assigned since September 22, 1978. Its last holder was Joseph Arthur Costello, auxiliary bishop of Newark.
