= James Johnston Navagh =

American prelate

His Excellency. The Most Reverend James Johnston Navagh
- Bishop of Paterson; Titular Bishop of Ombi
- See: Diocese of Paterson
- In office: February 12, 1963 – October 2, 1965
- Predecessor: James A. McNulty
- Successor: Lawrence B. Casey
- Other posts: Auxiliary Bishop of Raleigh (1952-1957); Bishop of Ogdensburg (1957–1963)

Orders
- Ordination: December 21, 1929 by William Turner
- Consecration: September 24, 1953 by Amleto Giovanni Cicognani

Personal details
- Born: April 4, 1901 Buffalo, New York, U.S.
- Died: October 2, 1965 (aged 64) Rome, Italy
- Denomination: Roman Catholic
- Parents: George and Catherine Navagh
- Education: Canisius College; Niagara University
- Motto: Ipsam cogitans non erras (Thinking of her, you do not stray)
- Coat of arms

James Johnston Navagh (April 4, 1901 – October 2, 1965) was an American prelate of the Roman Catholic Church. He served as an auxiliary bishop of the Diocese of Raleigh in North Carolina (1952-1957), bishop of the Diocese of Ogdensburg in New York (1957–1963) and bishop of the Diocese of Paterson in New Jersey (1963–1965).

== Biography ==
=== Early life ===
James Navagh was born on April 4, 1901, in Buffalo, New York to George and Catherine Navagh. He earned a Bachelor of Arts degree from Canisius College in Buffalo and a Master of Arts from Niagara University in Lewiston, New York.

=== Priesthood ===
Navagh was ordained to the priesthood at St. Joseph Cathedral in Buffalo by Bishop William Turner for the Diocese of Buffalo on December 21, 1929. After his ordination, the diocese assigned Navagh as a curate at Holy Cross Parish in Buffalo. In 1937, he was appointed pastor of Our Lady of Mount Carmel Parish in Brant, New York. Navagh was named the first director of the Missionary Apostolate of the diocese in 1939, and served as pastor of St. Joseph's Parish in Fredonia, New York, from 1940 to 1942.

=== Auxiliary Bishop of Raleigh ===
On July 29, 1952, Navagh was appointed as an auxiliary bishop of Raleigh and titular bishop of Ombi by Pope Pius XII. He received his episcopal consecration at St. Joseph Cathedral on September 24, 1952, from Archbishop Amleto Cicognani, with Bishops Raymond Kearney and James H. Griffiths serving as co-consecrators.

=== Bishop of Ogdensburg ===
Coat of arms as bishop of Ogdensburg

Navagh was named the seventh bishop of Ogdensburg by Pius XII on May 8, 1957. He founded Mater Dei College in Ogdensburg in 1960.

=== Bishop of Paterson ===
On February 12, 1963, Pope John XXIII appointed Navagh to succeed James A. McNulty as the fourth bishop of Paterson.James Navagh died on October 2, 1965, from a heart attack in Rome while attending the Second Vatican Council; he was age 64.

Catholic Church titles
Preceded by Antonio Ignacio Camargo	Titular Bishop of Ombi; September 24, 1952 – May 2, 1957	Succeeded by Karol Jozef Wojtyla
Preceded by –	Auxiliary Bishop of Raleigh; September 24, 1952 – May 2, 1957	Succeeded by –
Preceded by Walter P. Kellenberg	Bishop of Ogdensburg; May 2, 1957 – February 12,1963	Succeeded by Leo Richard Smith
Preceded by James A. McNulty	Bishop of Paterson; February 12, 1963 – October 2, 1965	Succeeded by Lawrence B. Casey
