= Cathedral of St. John the Baptist (Paterson, New Jersey) =

Historic church in Paterson, New Jersey, United States

- St. John's Cathedral
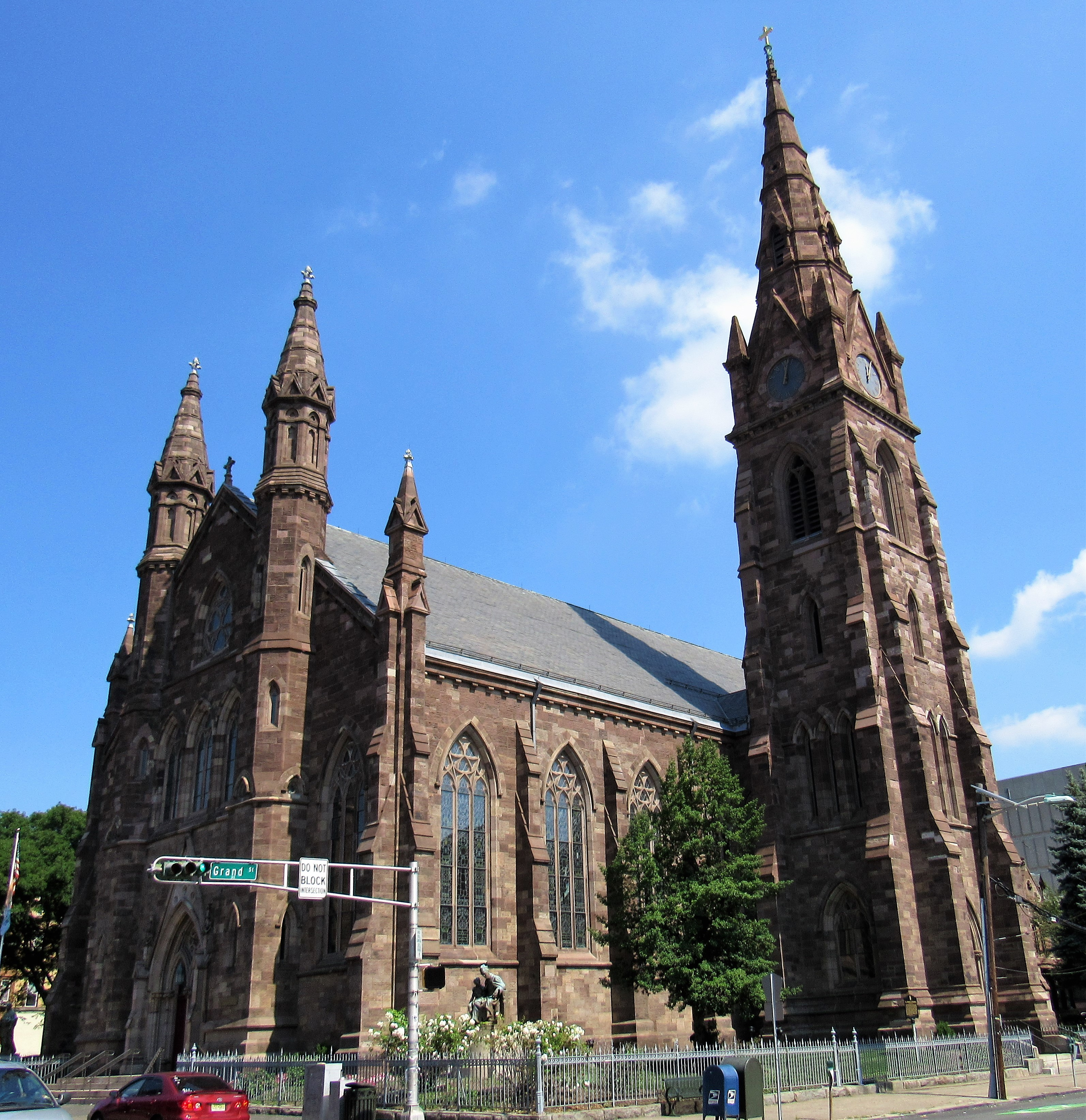

- Location within Passaic County, New Jersey
- 40°54′46″N 74°10′21″W
- Location: 381 Grand Street; Paterson, New Jersey
- Country: United States
- Denomination: Roman Catholic
- Website: rcdopcathedral.org

History
- Former name: St. John's Church
- Status: Cathedral
- Dedicated: July 31, 1870
- Consecrated: June 29, 1890

Architecture
- Functional status: Active
- Architect: P. C. Keely of New York
- Architectural type: Cathedral
- Style: Neo-gothic
- Groundbreaking: September 10, 1865
- Construction cost: $200,000

Specifications
- Capacity: 1,700-1,800
- Length: 180 feet (55 m)
- Width: 88 feet (27 m)
- Materials: Brownstone, most of which was obtained from local quarries in Little Falls

Administration
- Diocese: Paterson

Clergy
- Bishop: Most Reverend Kevin J. Sweeney
- Rector: Rev. Msgr. Eugene (Geno) R. Sylva, S.T.D.
- Vicar(s): Rev. Jorge Castaño; Rev. Cesar D. Jaramillo, JCL
- Cathedral of St. John the Baptist
- U.S. National Register of Historic Places
- New Jersey Register of Historic Places
- NRHP reference No.: 77000903
- NJRHP No.: 2367

Significant dates
- Designated: December 16, 1977
- Designated NJRHP: June 13, 1977

The Cathedral of St. John the Baptist is a historic Catholic cathedral and parish church located in Paterson, Passaic County, New Jersey, United States. It is the seat of the Roman Catholic Diocese of Paterson. The cathedral was listed on the National Register of Historic Places in 1977.

== History ==
By the middle of the 1820s, there were definite indications that the local Catholic population was increasing. Coupled with the tremendous growth of Paterson industries, there was an insistent demand for skilled millhands and other types of workers. By 1870, the U.S. Census reported that Irish immigrants constituted the dominant foreign-born population in the city. The majority of the Irish, along with other immigrant classes, lived in ramshackle tenement houses within almost walking distance of the great mills. Most conspicuously, the Irish clustered about Grand Street, and this area became known as the "Dublin" section of Paterson. It was there, among the Irish-Catholic immigrants, that Father William N. McNulty began his priestly duties.

Two years after arriving in Paterson to take "charge of the fortunes and spiritual welfare" of the rapidly growing Catholic population, Father McNulty entered into negotiations with the powerful industrial corporation, the Society for Establishing Useful Manufactures ("S.U.M."), and in 1865 purchased from it sixteen lots on the corner of Grand and Main streets thus ensuring the future of a more larger St. John's Church (later Cathedral of St. John the Baptist). The new enterprise seemed to infuse new vigor into the members of the congregation, and the full amount of the purchase money of the real estate ($10,000) was raised in two months. Preparations were made for the construction of the new church, New York architect P. C. Keely was retained in order to develop plans "for an edifice ... unequaled in New Jersey", and on September 10, 1865, the cornerstone was laid.

The church was ready for use in the summer of 1870, and a final tabulation a number of years later revealed that approximately $200,000 had been spent in the course of construction. It was raised to cathedral status when the Diocese of Paterson was established in 1937.

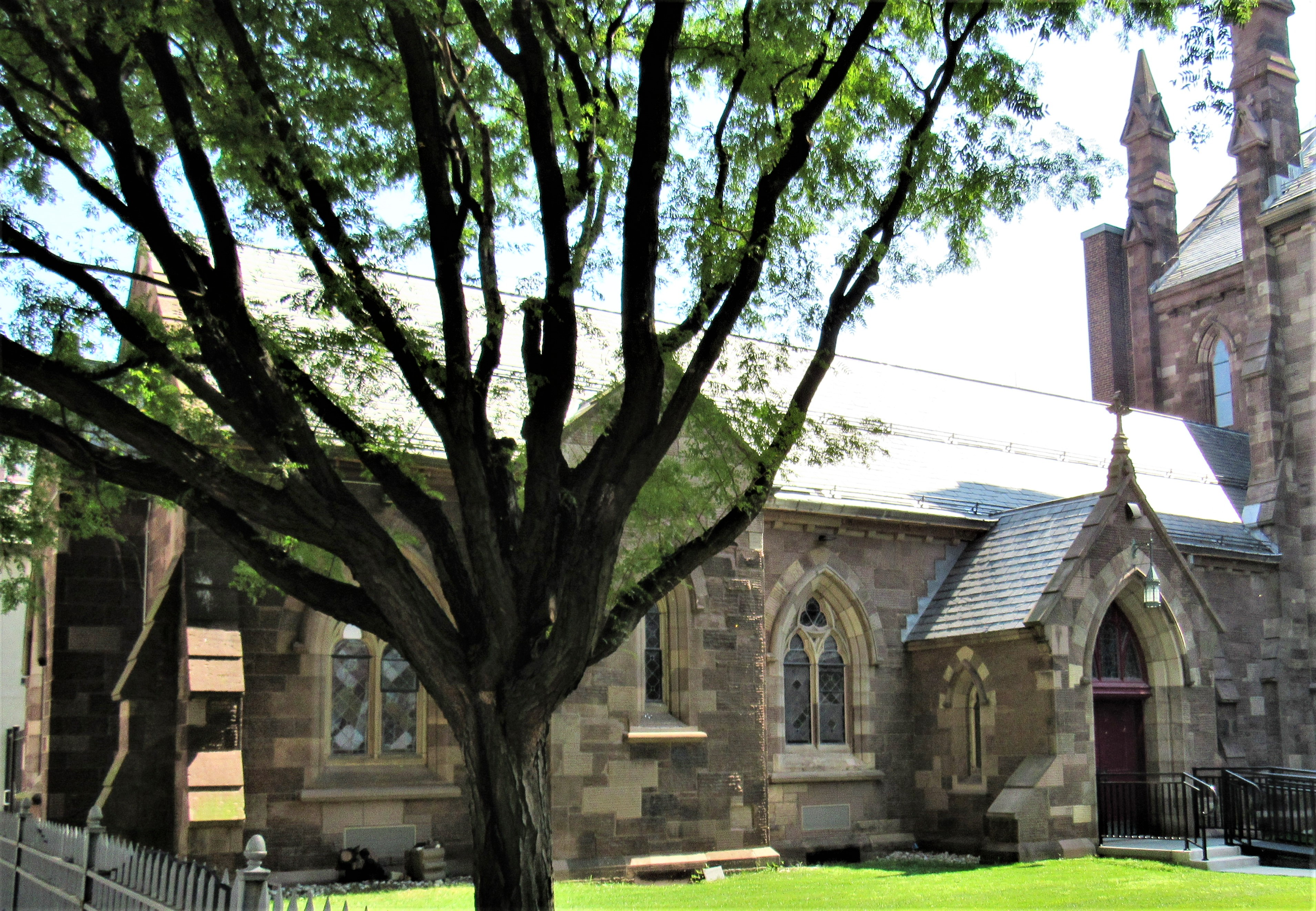
Chapel of Our Lady

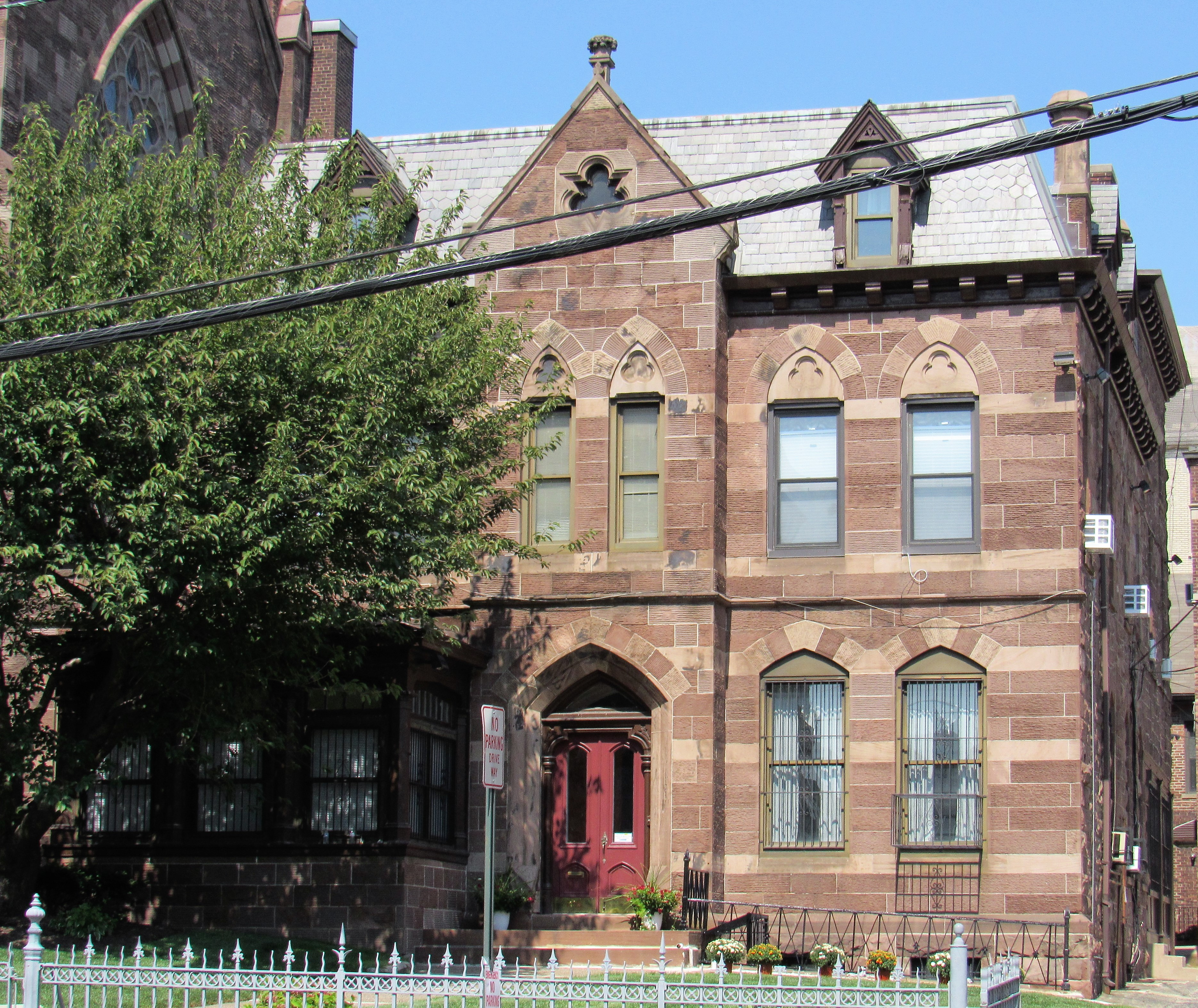
Rectory

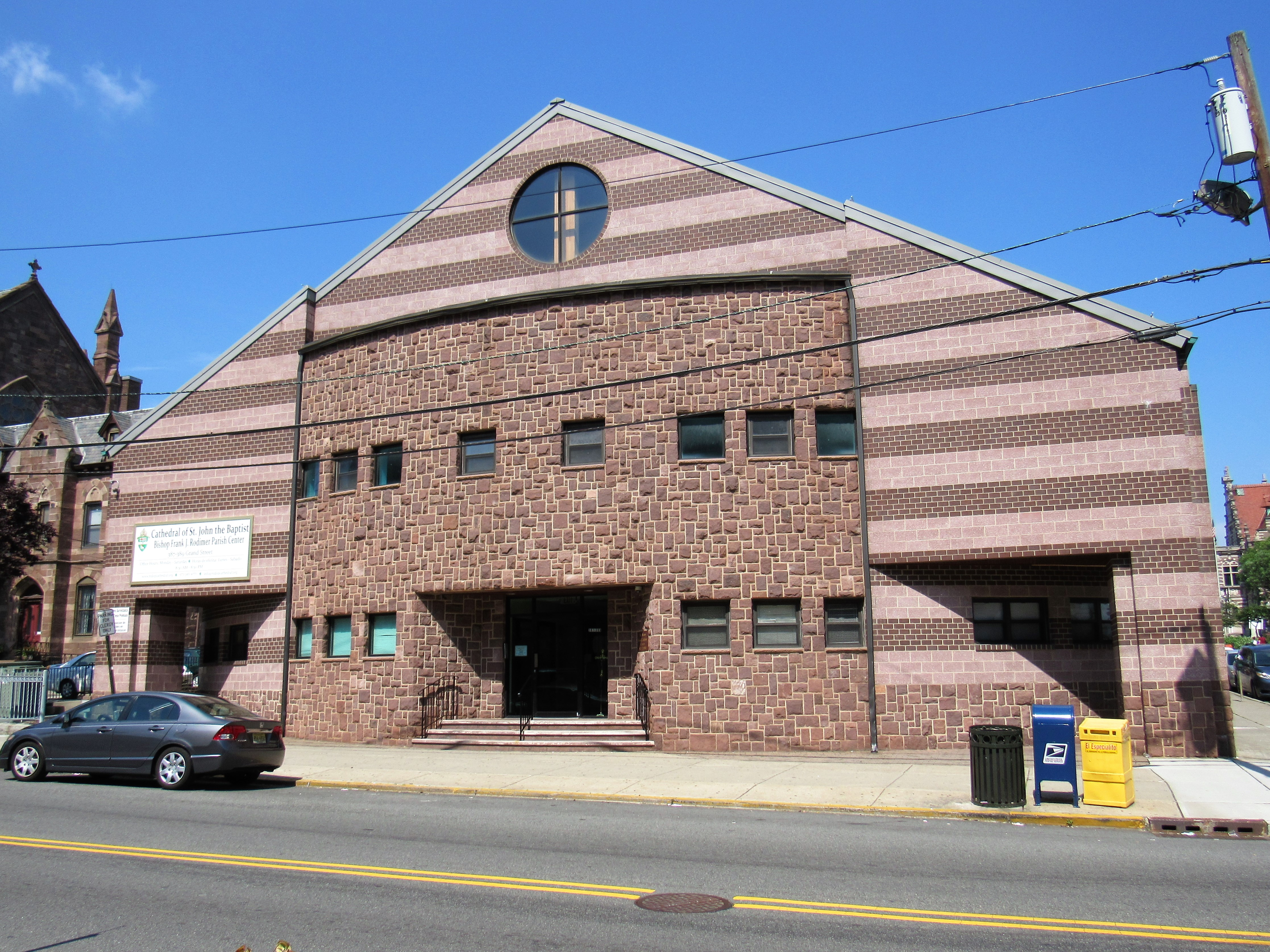
Bishop Frank J. Rodimer Parish Center

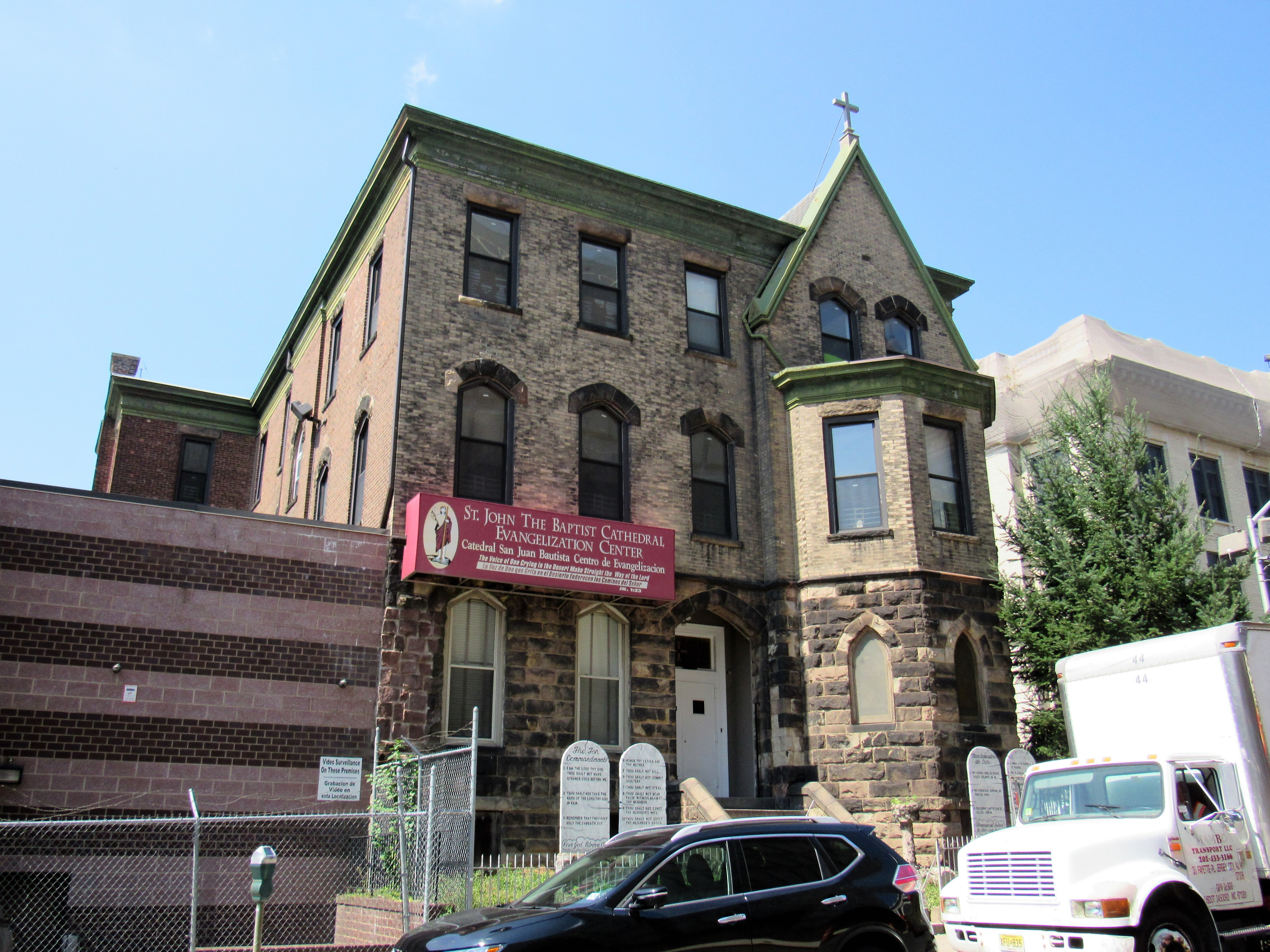
Evangelization Center

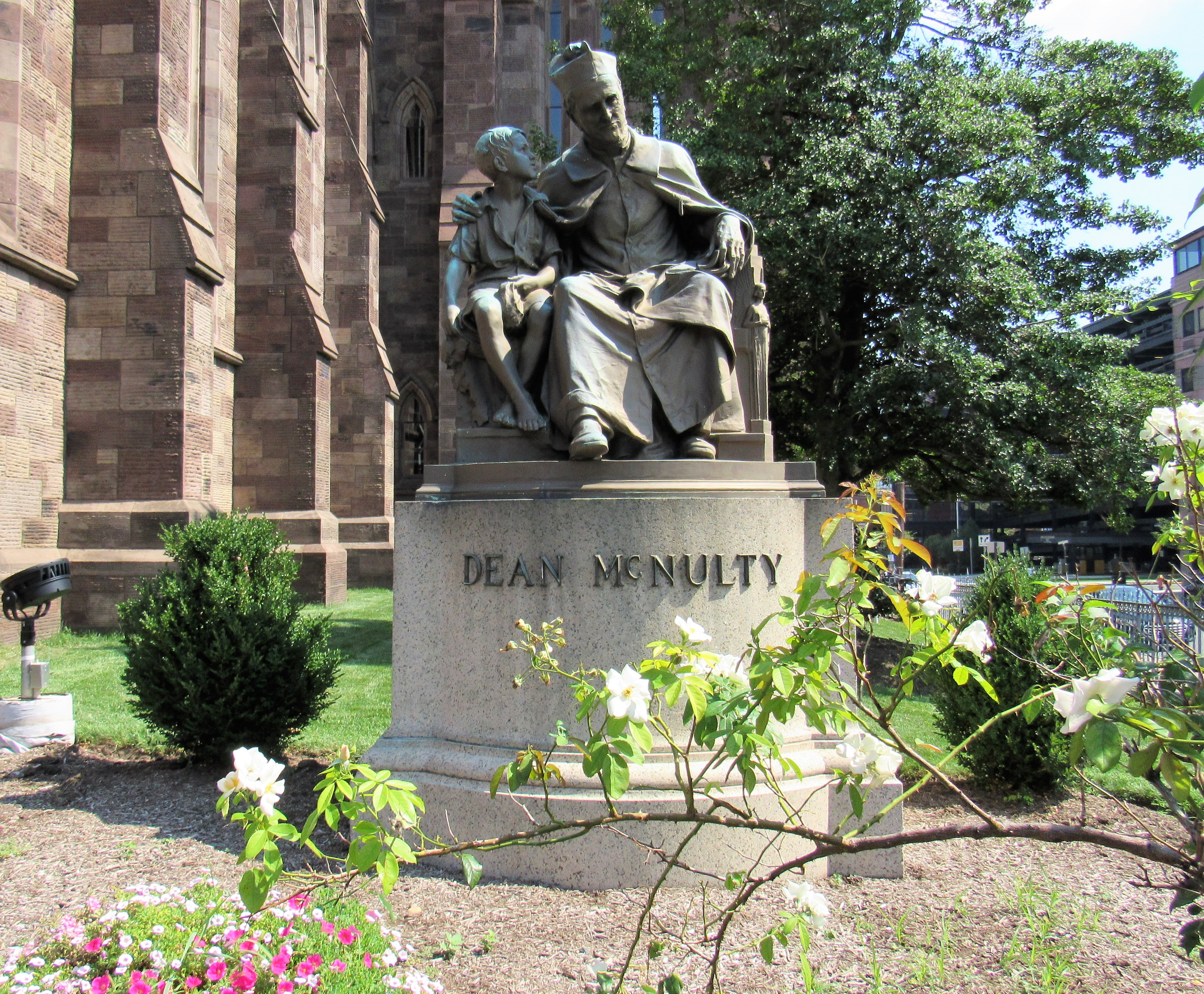
Dean McNulty memorial

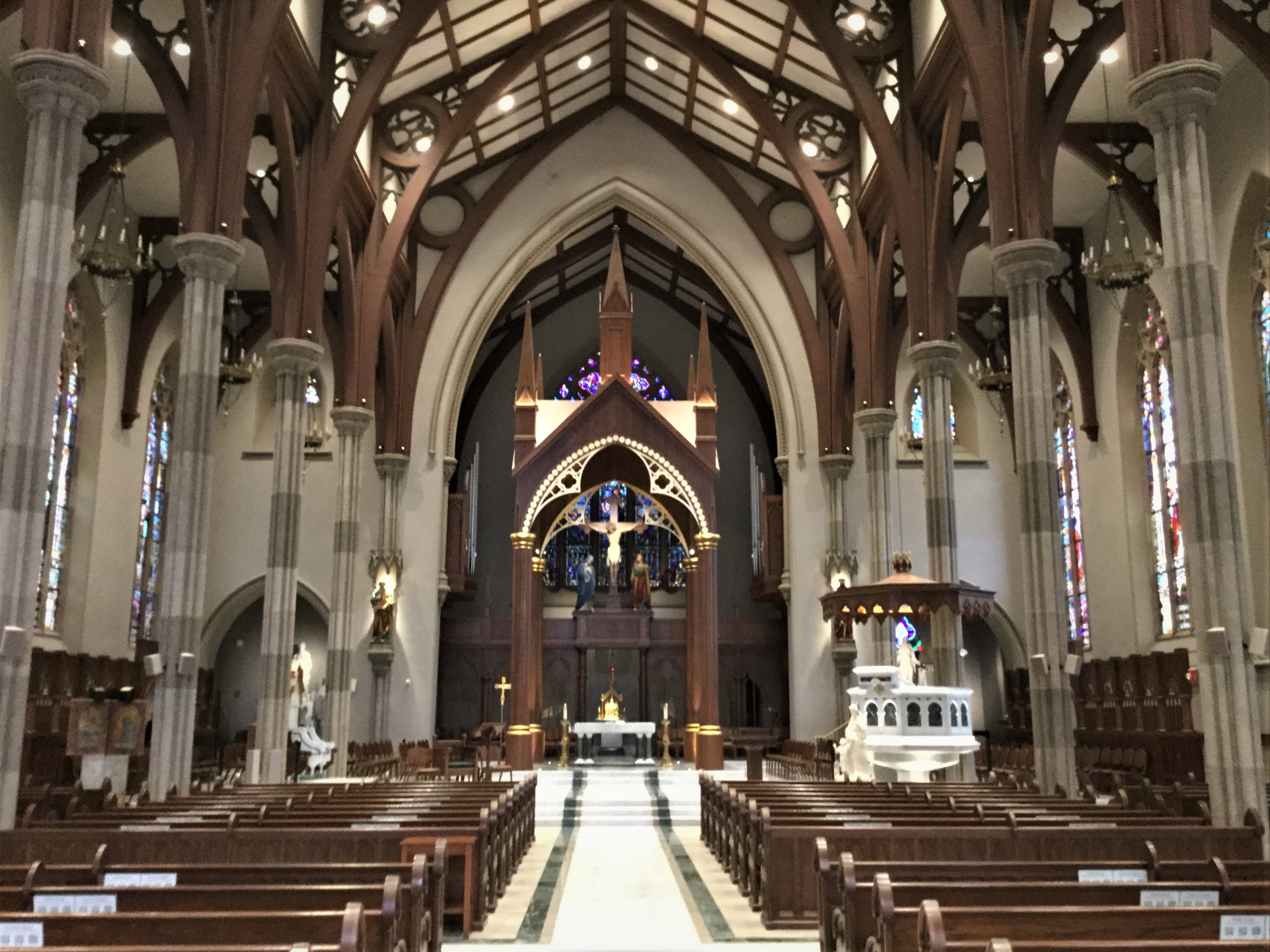
Interior, Cathedral of St. John the Baptist

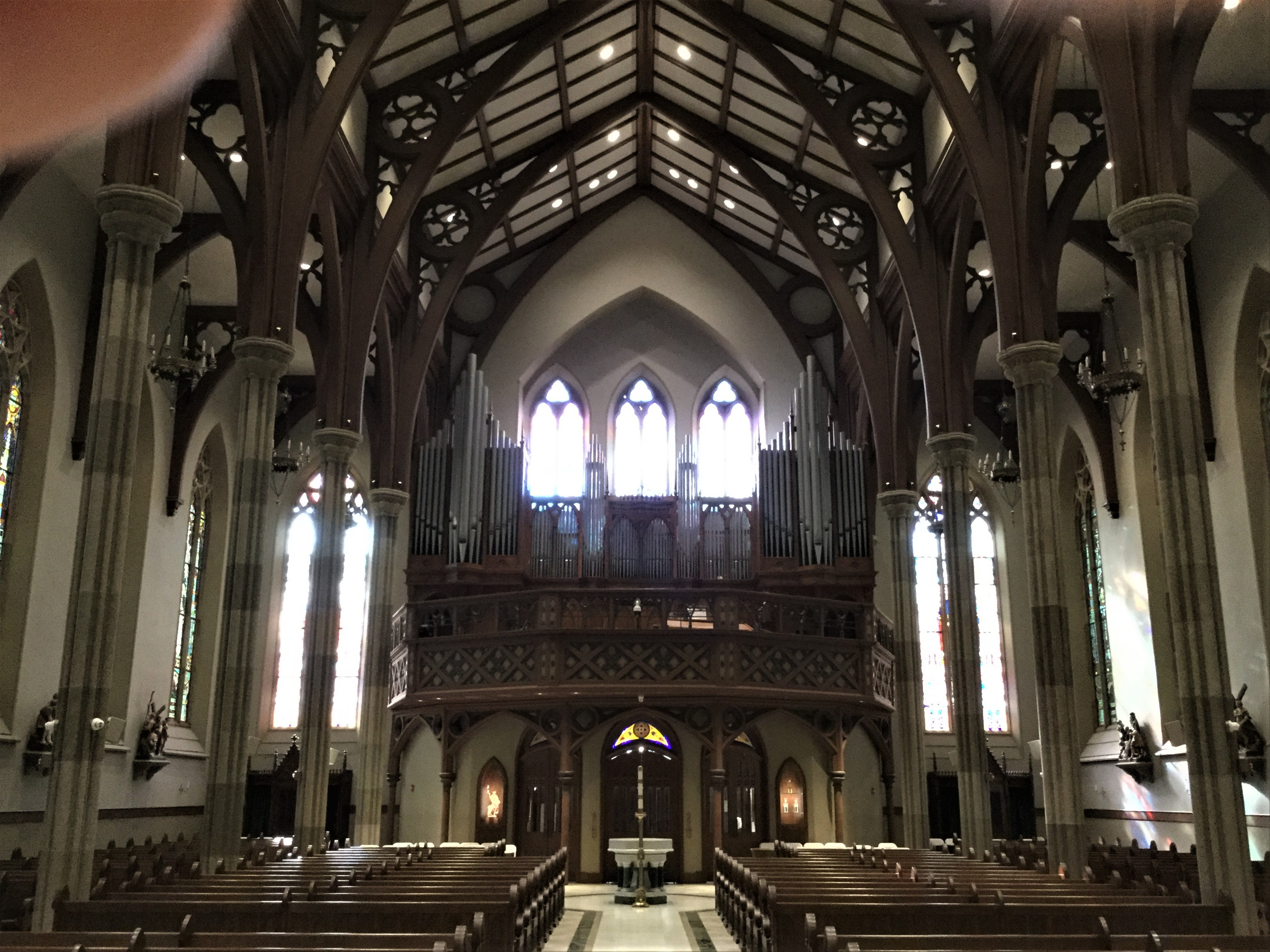
Rear of Cathedral of St. John the Baptist

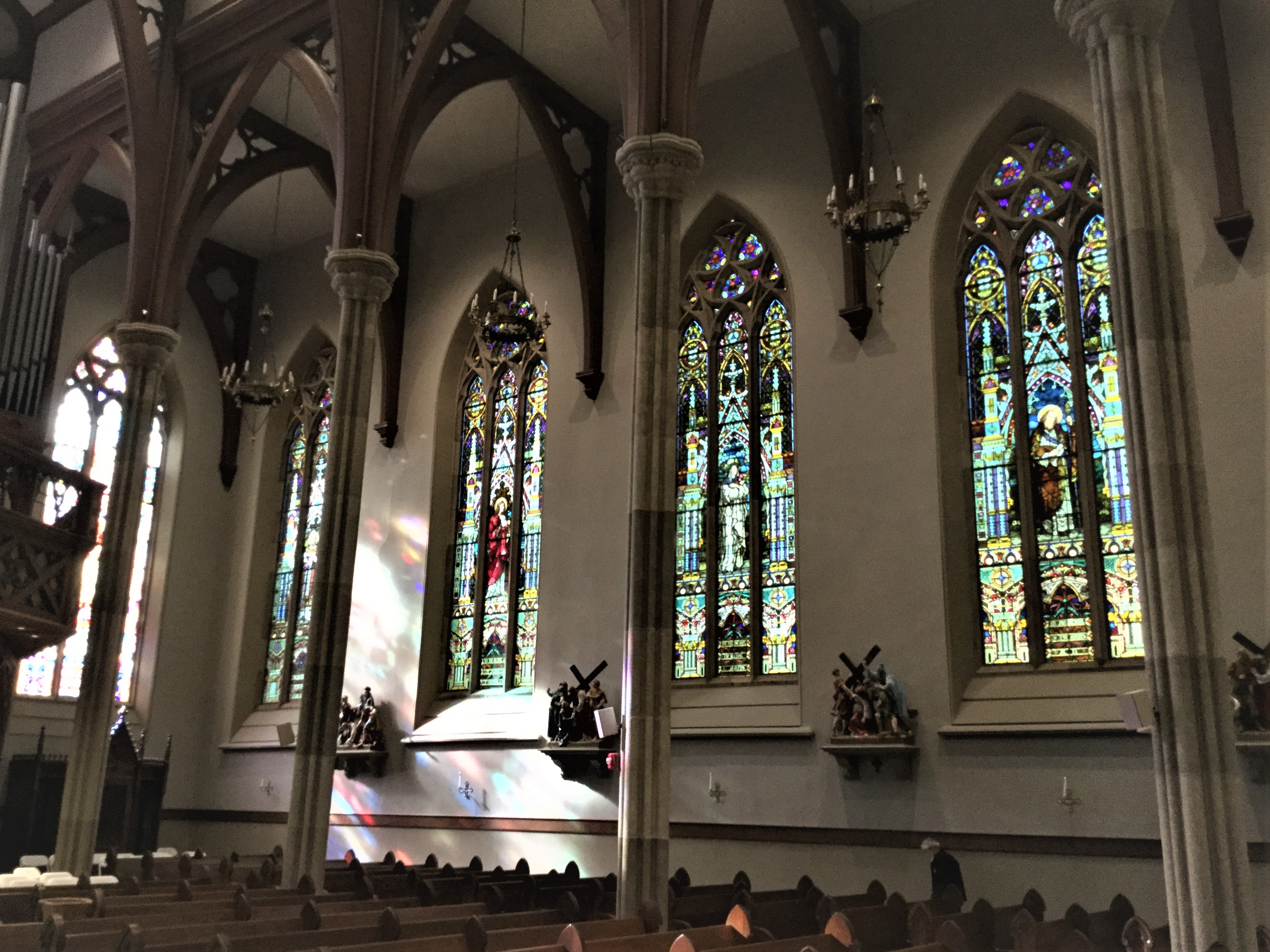
Stained glass on the left side of the cathedral

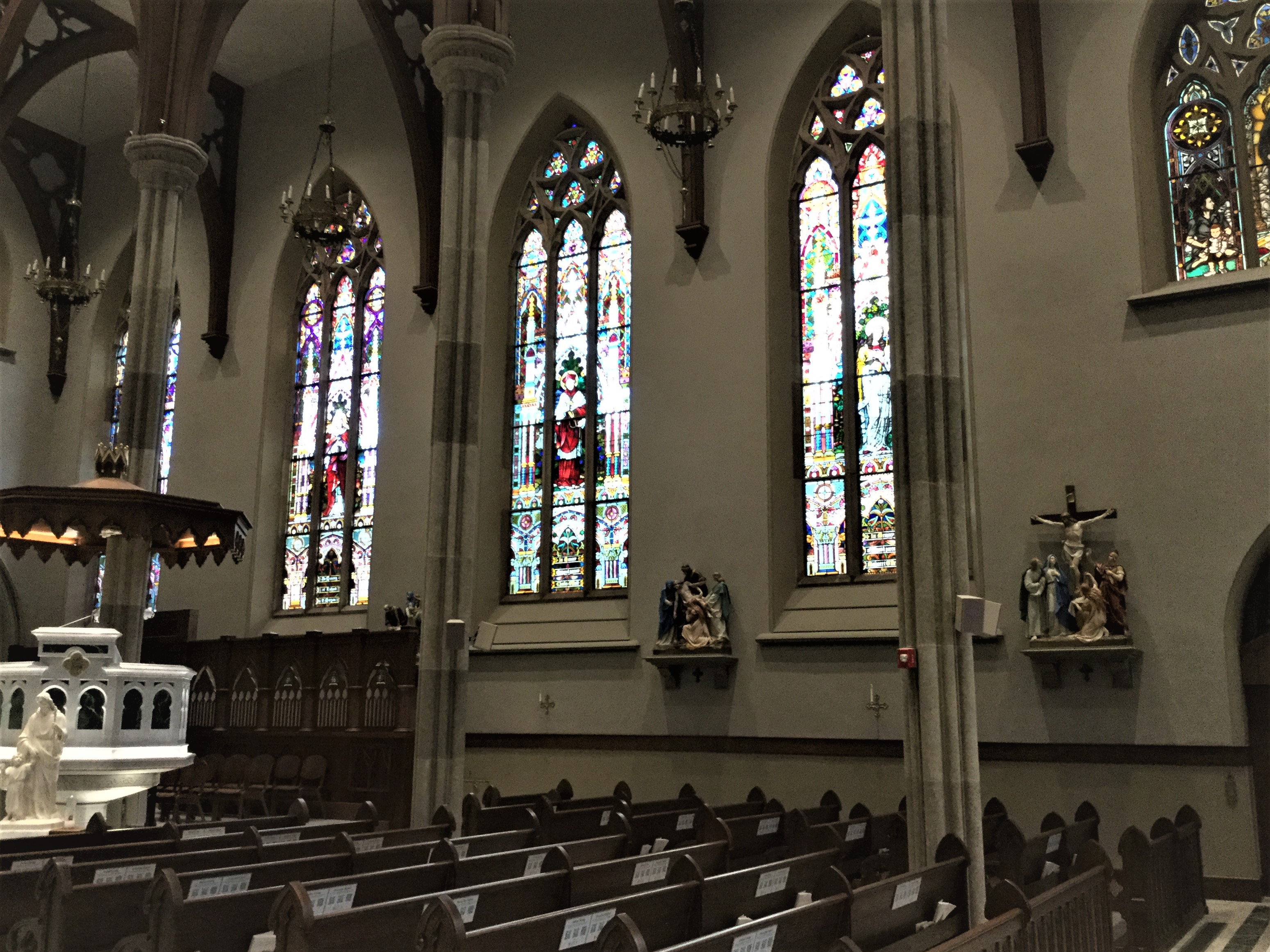
Stained glass on the right side of the cathedral

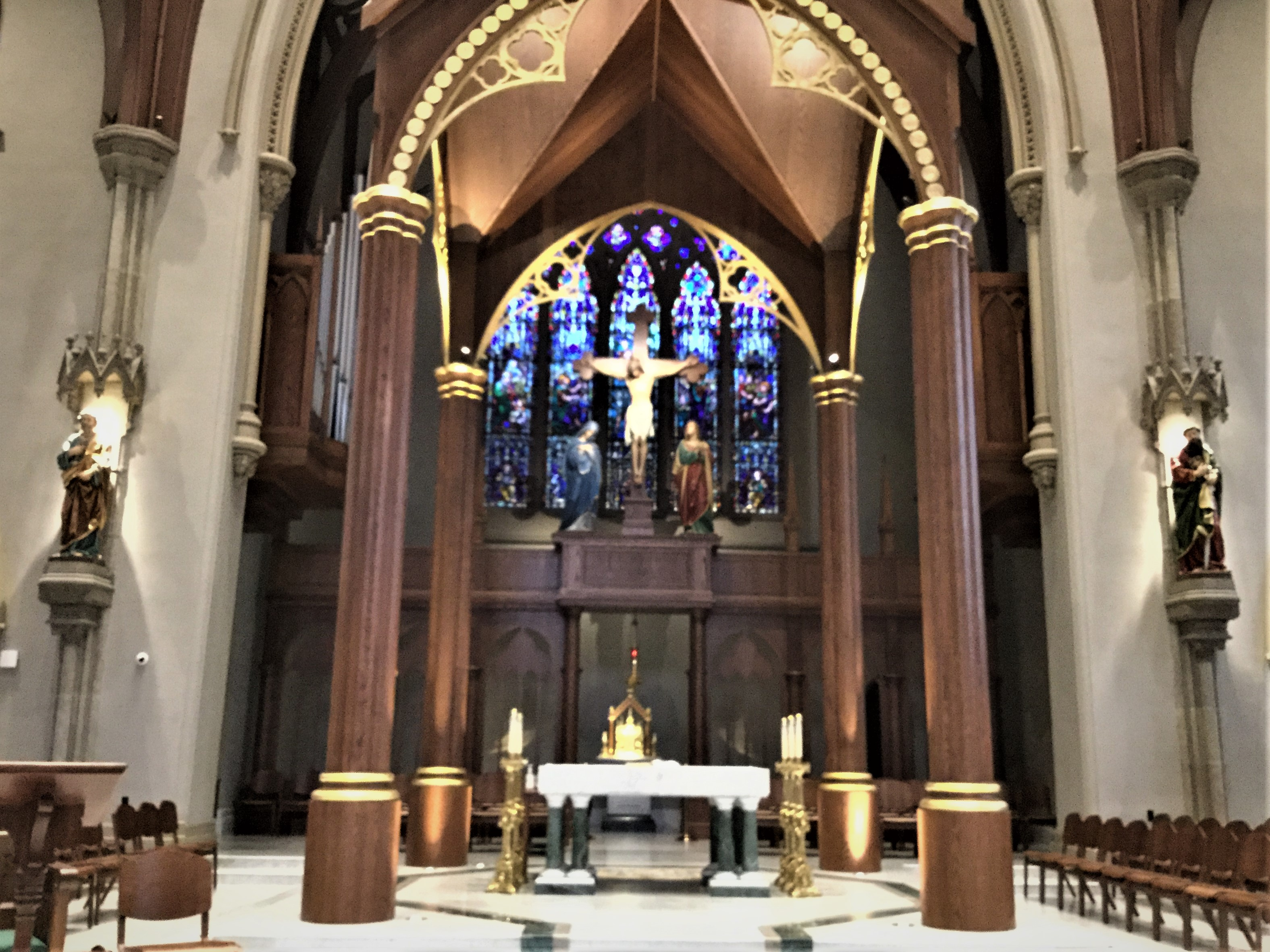
Close-up of the altar

== See also ==
- List of Catholic cathedrals in the United States
- List of cathedrals in the United States
- List of tallest buildings in Paterson
