= Diocese of Paterson =

New Jersey diocese of the Catholic Church

Coordinates: 40°54′53.09″N 74°09′46.18″W

Diocese of Paterson Dioecesis Patersonensis
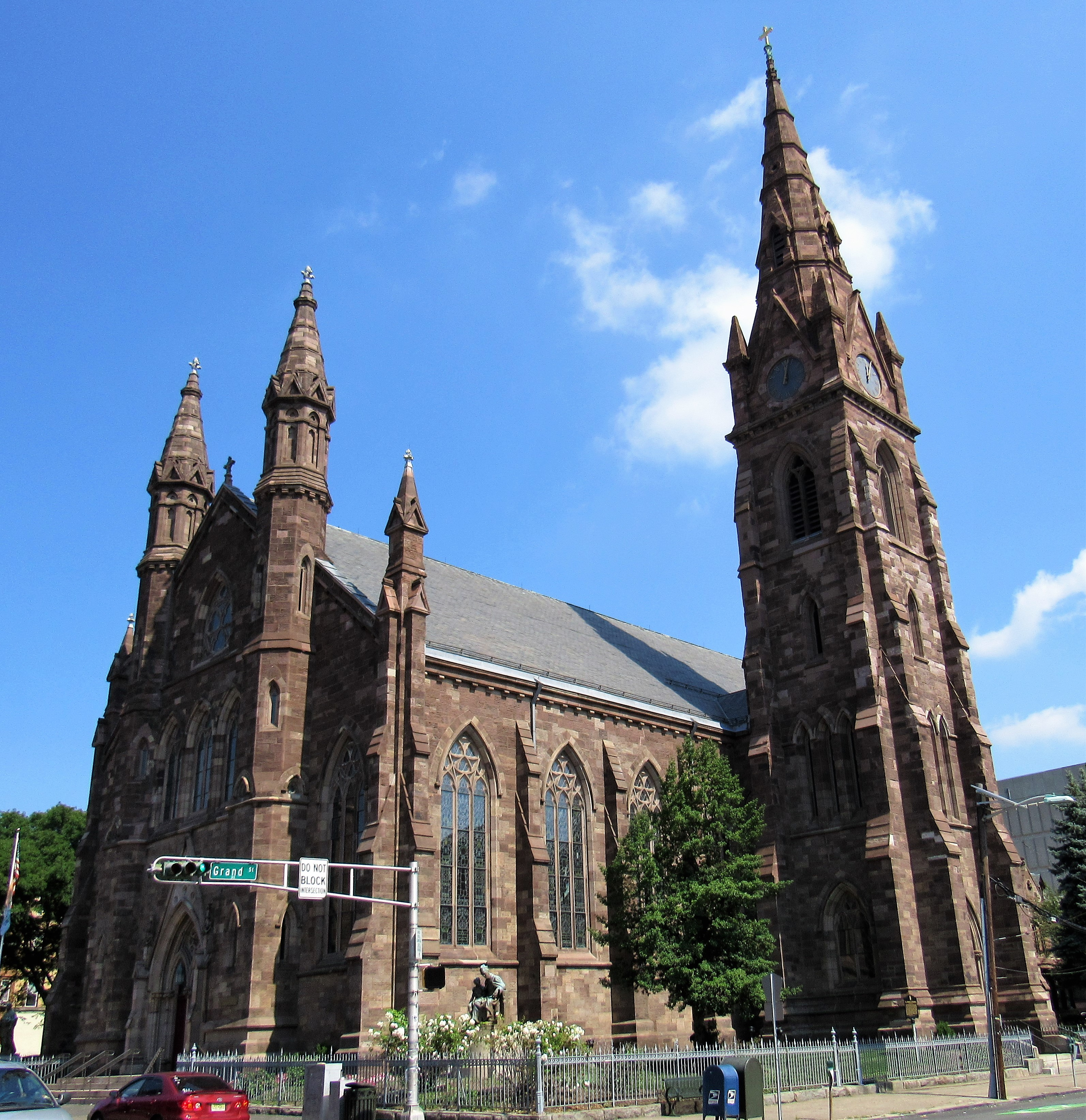
- Cathedral of St. John the Baptist

- Coat of arms

Location
- Country: United States
- Territory: Northern New Jersey: Passaic, Morris, and Sussex Counties
- Ecclesiastical province: Metropolitan Province of Newark
- Population: (as of 2004); 420,172 (36.8%)

Information
- Denomination: Catholic
- Sui iuris church: Latin Church
- Rite: Roman Rite
- Established: December 9, 1937
- Cathedral: Cathedral of Saint John the Baptist
- Patron saint: Saint John the Baptist, Saint Patrick

Current leadership
- Pope: Leo XIV
- Bishop: Kevin J. Sweeney
- Metropolitan Archbishop: Joseph Tobin
- Bishops emeritus: Arthur J. Serratelli

Map
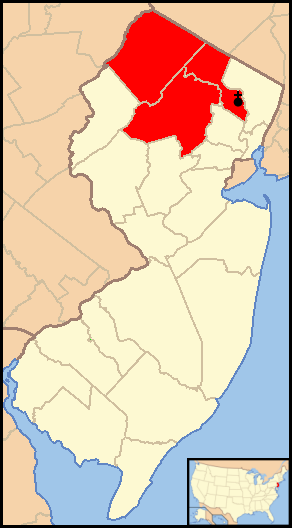

Website
- patersondiocese.org

The Diocese of Paterson (Latin: Dioecesis Patersonensis) is a diocese of the Catholic Church in northern New Jersey in the United States. It is a suffragan diocese of the Archdiocese of Newark. The patrons of the diocese are Saint Patrick and John the Baptist. The bishop is Kevin J. Sweeney.

== Statistics ==
The diocese in 2023 consisted of approximately 440,000 Catholics out of a total population of 1,800,000.

== History ==
=== 1700 to 1800 ===
Although the British Provinces of East Jersey and West Jersey were not officially welcoming to Catholics, they tended to ignore their presence. During the mid 1700s, priests would periodically visit German Catholic workers at the iron mills in Passaic County. The first parish in New Jersey, Saint Joseph’s, was established in West Milford in 1765.

The assistance of Catholic French troops during the American Revolution helped to abate anti-Catholic sentiment in all of the 13 original colonies. In 1784, Pope Pius VI erected the Apostolic Prefecture of United States of America, including all of the new United States. In 1789, the same pope raised this prefecture to the Diocese of Baltimore.

=== 1800 to 1900 ===
As the population of the United States grew, the Vatican in 1808 established the Dioceses of Philadelphia and New York. In 1820, Bishop John Connolly of New York sent Richard Bulger to Paterson to serve as first resident priest in New Jersey. In 1821, Bulger established St. John the Baptist Church, the first church of any denomination in Paterson. Waves of Irish and German Catholic immigrants flooded into the area during the mid-1800s.

In 1853, the Vatican erected the Diocese of Newark from the Archdiocese of New York and the Diocese of Philadelphia. The Paterson area would remain part of the Diocese of Newark for the next 84 years. In 1867, the Sisters of Charity of Saint Elizabeth founded St. Joseph's Hospital in Paterson.It is today St. Joseph's University Medical Center.

Sacred Heart Church, the first Catholic church in Clifton, was dedicated in 1897. That same year, St. Mary's Hospital opened in Passaic.It is today St. Mary's General Hospital. The College of Saint Elizabeth in Morris Township was founded in 1899 by the Sisters of Charity of Saint Elizabeth. It was one of the first Catholic colleges in the United States to award degrees to women. It is today Saint Elizabeth University.

=== 1900 to 2000 ===
Bishop McLaughlin (pre-1947)

The Diocese of Paterson was established by Pope Pius XI on December 9, 1937, taking its territory from Diocese of Newark. The pope named Auxiliary Bishop Thomas H. McLaughlin of Newark as the first bishop of Paterson. St. John the Baptist Church in Paterson was designated as the diocesan cathedral. In 1938, McLaughlin established Associated Catholic Charities in the diocese.

Following the death of McLaughlin in 1947, Pope Pius XII that same year appointed Auxiliary Bishop Thomas Boland of Newark as the second bishop of Paterson. Boland served in Paterson for five years before being appointed archbishop of Newark in 1952.

Boland was succeeded by Auxiliary Bishop James A. McNulty of Newark, named by Pius XII in 1953. During his tenure, he established thirteen new parishes. In 1963, McNulty became bishop of the Diocese of Buffalo. To succeed McNulty, that same year Pope John XXIII appointed Bishop James Navagh from the Diocese of Ogdensburg as the fourth bishop of the diocese of Paterson. He died suddenly in 1965.

Pope Paul VI in 1966 appointed Auxiliary Bishop Lawrence B. Casey from the Diocese of Rochester as Navagh's replacement in Paterson. Casey died in 1977. Frank Rodimer of Paterson was named by Paul VI as the next bishop of Paterson, the first native of the diocese to serve that role.

As bishop, Rodimer wrote a weekly column for the diocesan newspaper, The Beacon. He also established a $7 million diocesan endowment to support Catholic schools, parishes and other diocesan ministries through fundraising. With corporate leaders, Rodimer established the Tri-County Scholarship fund to provide scholarships to needy students attending Catholic schools. During his tenure, Rodimer expressed his opposition to capital punishment and to permanent replacements for striking workers.

=== 2000 to present ===
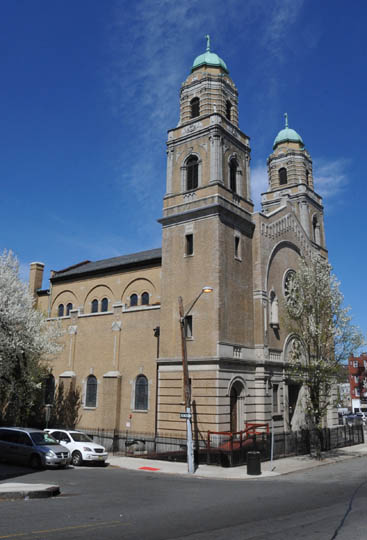
St. Michael the Archangel Church, Paterson, New Jersey (2008)

After Rodimer retired in 2004, Auxiliary Bishop Arthur J. Serratelli of Newark succeeded him. After Serratelli retired in 2020, Kevin J. Sweeney of the Diocese of Brooklyn succeeded him.

In August 2024, the diocese, along with its Colombian and Filipino priests, filed an immigration case against the US Department of State, the US Department of Homeland Security, and the United States Citizenship and Immigration Services. The action stemmed from policy changes in EB-4 worker visa procedures for foreign-born clergy. The diocese dropped the lawsuit in November 2025 after reaching an agreement with the Trump Administration.

=== Sexual abuse ===
In 1985, Mark Serrano reported to the Diocese of Paterson that he was sexually abused as a child by James Hanley, a pastor of St. Joseph's Parish. The abuse started when Serrano was age nine in 1974 and continued until he was age 16. The diocese removed Hanley from ministry in 1986 and paid a $241,000 financial settlement to Serrano and his family. Hanley was laicized by the Vatican at his own request in 2003.

Timothy J. Brennan, a religious order priest, pleaded guilty in 1987 to aggravated sexual contact in 1984 with a 15-year-old student while teaching at Delbarton High School in Morris County. Receiving a one-year suspended sentence, his religious order, St. Mary’s Abbey, sent him to treatment. Brennan then went to work in the Diocese of Rochester, which was not alerted to the priest's previous conviction. In 2002, St. Mary’s Abbey permanently removed Brennan from ministry.

The Diocese of Paterson in May 1987 received allegations of sexual abuse against Jose Alonso, rector of St. Joseph Cathedral. He was accused of abusing two teenage brothers. The diocese sent Alonso to the Servants of the Paraclete facility in New Mexico for treatment and immediately notified local authorities. Earlier in the 1980s, the diocese had received complaints about Alonso. Later in 1987, Alonso was convicted and sentenced to five years in prison.

In 2004, the diocese settled lawsuits from 27 victims of sexual abuse by Hanley, Alonso and several other clerics. In February 2019, the diocese released the names of 28 clergy with credible accusations of sexually abusing children since 1940. In December 2019, more accusers of Hanley filed new lawsuits against the diocese. By 2020, the names of 40 accused clergy listed were made public.

A jury in October 2025 awarded a $5 million judgement to a man who claimed to have been sexually assaulted by Richard Lott, a religious order priest, during the 1970s. The judgement was shared by the diocese and the Order of St. Benedict of New Jersey. The Benedictines operated the Delbarton School, the site of the alleged crime.

== Bishops ==
=== Bishops of Paterson ===
1. Thomas Henry McLaughlin (1937–1947)
2. Thomas Aloysius Boland (1947–1952), appointed Archbishop of Newark
3. James A. McNulty (1953–1963), appointed Bishop of Buffalo
4. James Johnston Navagh (1963–1965)
5. Lawrence B. Casey (1966–1977)
6. Frank Joseph Rodimer (1978–2004)
7. Arthur J. Serratelli (2004–2020)
8. Kevin J. Sweeney (2020–present)

== Deaneries and parishes ==
The 109 parishes of the Diocese of Paterson are split into twelve deaneries spanning the three counties.Our Lady of Fatima Traditional Latin Mass Chapel, located in Pequannock, is not considered a parish of the Diocese of Paterson. Instead, it is a chapel of ease administered by the Priestly Fraternity of St. Peter.

=== Higher education ===
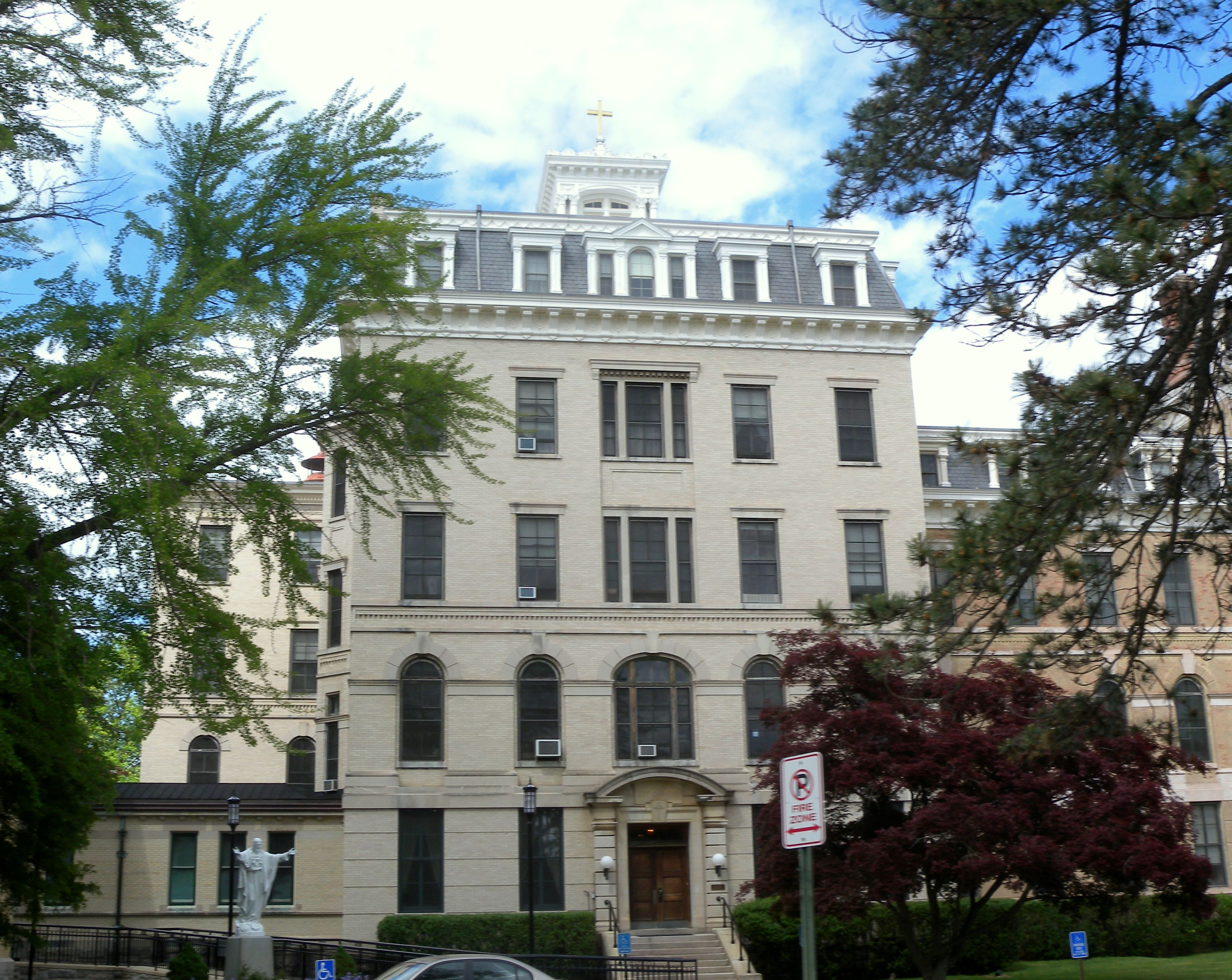
St. Elizabeth University, Morris Township, New Jersey (2010)

- Assumption College for Sisters – Mendham (operated by the Sisters of Christian Charity)
- Saint Elizabeth University – Convent Station (operated by the Sisters of Charity of Saint Elizabeth)

=== Diocesan high schools ===
- DePaul Catholic High School – Wayne
- Morris Catholic High School – Denville
- Pope John XXIII Regional High School – Sparta

=== Other Catholic high schools ===
- Academy of Saint Elizabeth – Convent Station (operated by the Sisters of Charity of Saint Elizabeth)
- Delbarton School – Morristown (operated by the Benedictine monks of Saint Mary's Abbey)
- Mary Help of Christians Academy – North Haledon (operated by the Salesian Sisters)
- Villa Walsh Academy – Morristown (operated by the Religious Teachers Filippini)

== Catholic hospitals ==
Saint Clare's Health System, part of Catholic Health Initiatives:

- St. Clare's Behavioral Health – Boonton (formerly Riverside Hospital)
- St. Clare's Denville Hospital – Denville
- St. Clare's Dover Hospital – Dover (formerly Dover General Hospital)

St. Joseph's Healthcare System, operated by the Sisters of Charity of Saint Elizabeth:

- St. Joseph's Children's Hospital – Paterson
- St. Joseph’s University Medical Center – Paterson
- St. Joseph's Wayne Medical Center – Wayne
- St. Mary's General Hospital – Passaic
