= St. Mary's Church (Albany, New York) =

Church in Albany, New York, US

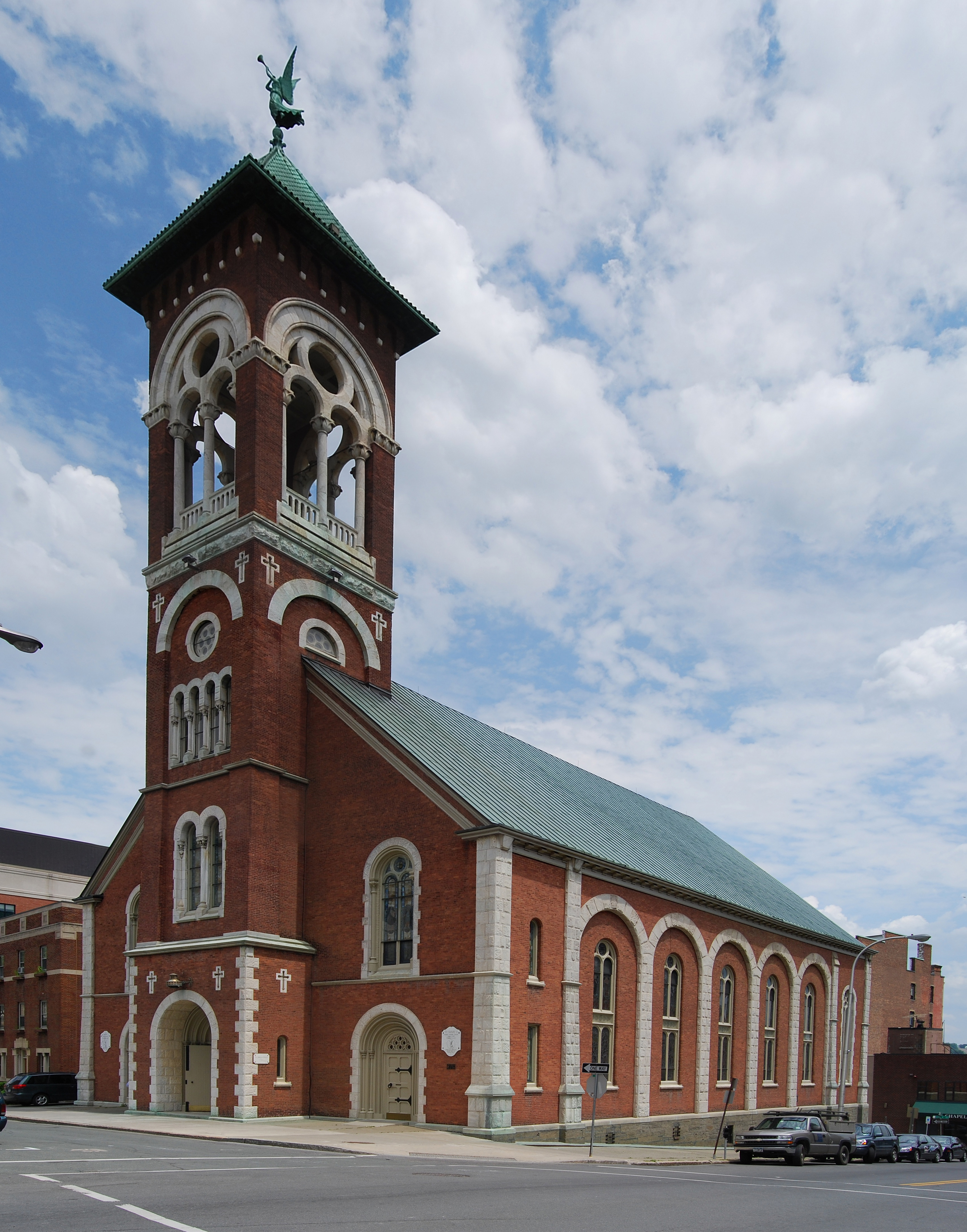
- West elevation and south profile, 2009

Religion
- Affiliation: Roman Catholic
- Leadership: Parochial Vicar: Rev. Jay J. Atherton; Pastor Emeritus: Rev. John T. Provost; Deacon: Walter Ayres; Deacon: Aaron Tremblay
- Year consecrated: 1870
- Status: Active

Location
- Location: 10 Lodge Street; Albany, NY, USA
- Interactive map of St. Mary's Church
- Coordinates: 42°39′6″N 73°45′10″W

Architecture
- Architects: Charles C. Nichols, Frederick Brown
- Style: Italian Romanesque Revival (exterior); Mannerist/French Gothic Revival (interior)
- Groundbreaking: 1867
- Completed: 1867
- Construction cost: $100,000

Specifications
- Direction of façade: west
- Height (max): 175 feet (53 m)
- Spire: 1
- Materials: brick and stone

U.S. National Register of Historic Places
- Added to NRHP: July 14, 1977
- NRHP Reference no.: 77000933

Website
- Historic St. Mary's Church

St. Mary's Church is a Roman Catholic house of worship on Lodge Street in downtown Albany, New York, United States. It is a brick structure with an Italian Romanesque Revival exterior. Built in the 1860s, it is the third church to house the oldest Catholic congregation not only in the city, but in all of upstate New York. In 1977, St. Mary's Church was listed on the National Register of Historic Places; it is also a contributing property to the Downtown Albany Historic District, listed several years later.

The congregation of St. Mary's was established in the late 18th century. Early in the next century, the first church was built on the present location when the city donated the land, supposedly on the property where St. Isaac Jogues took shelter after escaping from captivity in the early 17th century. The current building, designed by local architects Nichols & Brown, is the third on the site; its tower was added in 1895. In the late 20th century, the interior and exterior were extensively renovated.

Some important figures in the American Church have visited or been associated with the church. John McCloskey, the first Bishop of Albany and later the first American-born cardinal, made St. Mary's his procathedral briefly. John Neumann, later a saint, celebrated a Mass there as a newly ordained priest. Clarence A. Walworth, a convert from Episcopalianism, who was the first advocate for the sainthood of Kateri Tekakwitha, among other contributions to the Church, was pastor of St. Mary's for most of the late 19th century and was responsible for much of the look of the current building, inside and out.

The church's interior incorporates a combination of the Mannerist and French Gothic styles, in contrast to its exterior. Upon completion of the tower in 1894, the church was wired, making it the first church in Albany to have electric lighting. In 1912, the original stained glass windows were replaced. Beyond these developments, there have been no significant changes to the building since its construction.

== Building ==
The church and neighboring rectory, on its north, occupy the block between Steuben Street on the north, Chapel Street on the east, Pine Street on the south and Lodge on the west. It is on the western edge of the Downtown Albany Historic District. The terrain rises gently to the west, and descends to the level ground adjacent to the Hudson River, a half-mile (1 km) to the east. The surrounding neighborhood is heavily developed and urban, with a mix of government, commercial and other institutional buildings.

A parking lot across Lodge separates the church from the home of the New York State Court of Appeals, the state's highest court. It, too, is listed on the Register, like Albany City Hall to its south, just past some other older buildings. On the northwest is the main Albany County courts building. A parking garage is to the south, across Pine, while commercial buildings are on the north and east.

Two other listed buildings are within two blocks. The old YMCA building is on Steuben at North Pearl Street (New York State Route 32) and to the southwest at Lodge and State Street (New York State Route 5) is St. Peter's Episcopal Church, a National Historic Landmark (NHL) designed by Richard Upjohn and his son. Another NHL, the New York State Capitol, is across Lafayette Park from the Court of Appeals and City Hall.

=== Exterior ===
The church is a two-and-a-half-story, three-by-six-bay brick structure with marble trim on a cut bluestone foundation, gradually exposed towards the rear by the slope of the underlying land. The middle bay on the west (front) facade projects slightly, forming the lower stages of the 175-foot (53 m) bell tower. Atop the main block is a steeply pitched gabled roof. A five-section semicircular apse is attached to the rear.

A stone water table sets off the foundation. Small barred windows are located in every bay along the basement. At the corners are slightly projecting stone columns. They are echoed by stone quoins on the tower. A stone cornice also divides the first and second stories on the west facade.

All three bays of the first floor have entrances in quoined triple-recessed round arches. On the outer two bays, narrow smooth round columns rise to the springline. Above the heavy wooden recessed-paneled door is a decorative transom with circular lights. On the second story, fenestration consists of round-arched stained glass windows, less recessed but flanked by more ornate columns.

On the side elevations, stone columns form round arches around all but the easternmost bay. Within their slight recesses are narrow four-paned stained glass. The rear bay is set off by columns like those on the corners and has no arch, but is otherwise similarly treated. At the roofline, a denticulated cornice is below the overhanging eave. A small vestibule connects the church to its rectory on the north.

==== Bell tower ====
There are four stages to the tower. On the first is the deeply recessed main entrance, with a treatment otherwise similar to the side entrances. The corners are quoined. A single narrow window with a round segmental arch in brick sits in the center of both side faces. Above them, and flanking a brass light fixture over the main entrance, are stone crosses with recessed middles set into the brick.

A sloped cornice, at a higher level than that on the main facade, sets off the next stage. It has the bottom of a two-stage recessed arch on both sides. Its sole fenestration is the ornate narrow double window on the east. Another cornice sets off the third stage, which has a four-part window topped by a small rosette-shaped window under an arch that becomes stone at the springline. The rosette becomes a semicircle on the sides, just above the gable apex.

Above the third stage, a frieze of rusticated stone blocks and another cornice sets off the fourth stage. On all sides, stone-topped arches, rising from foliate stonecarvings at the springline, open into the belfry. They are supported by stone columns with a small balustrade at the base. At the top, brick corbels on stone bases support the broad overhanging eave of the pyramidal roof, clad in green tile. It is crowned by an Angel of Judgment blowing a trumpet.

=== Interior ===
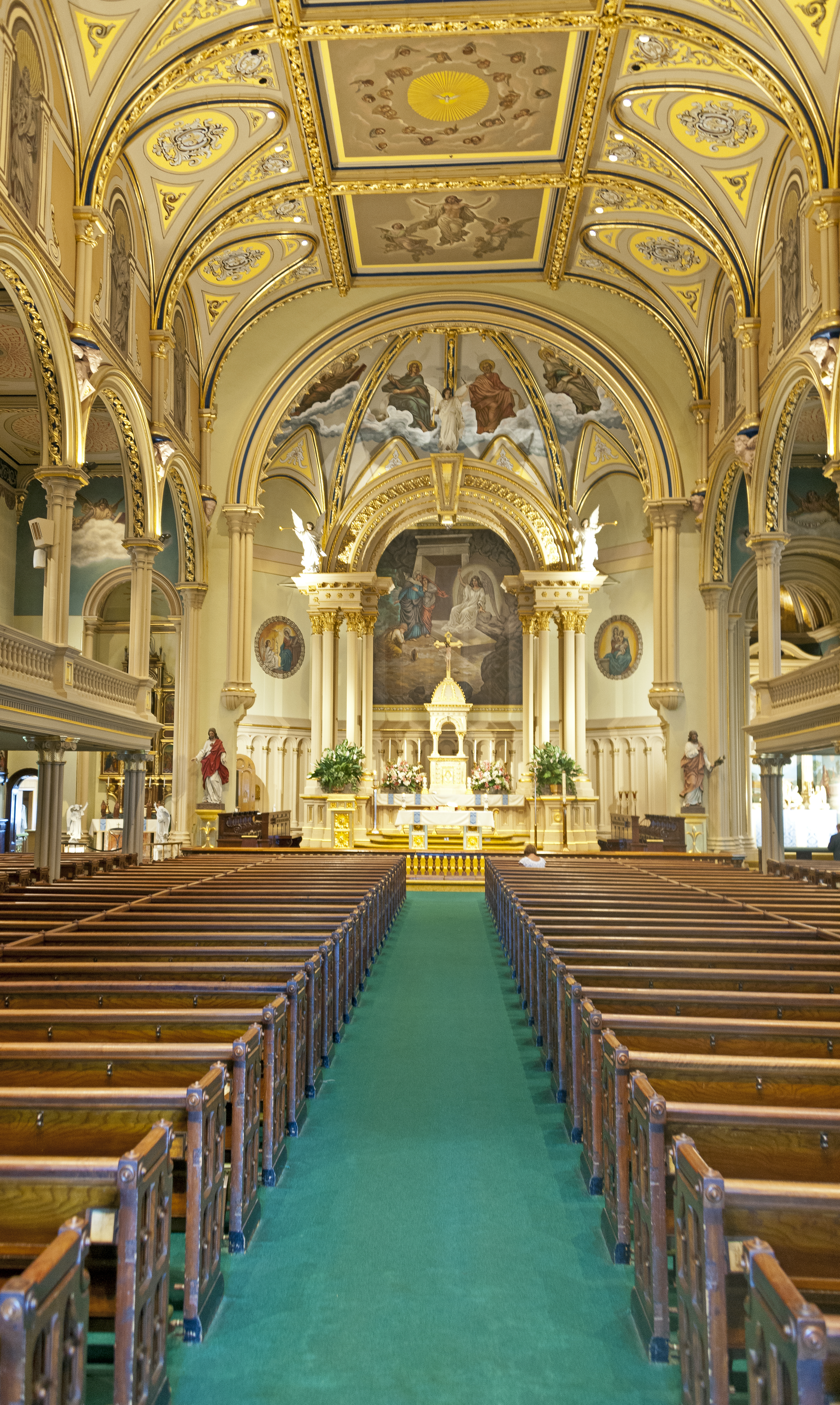
Church interior

In the church vestibule is a baptismal font, made of white Carrara marble with a pewter upper covering and silver basin. Inside, a gallery runs around the sides and back on the upper story, supported by clustered columns in a French Gothic style. It ends near the chancel, creating the illusion of transept arms on either side. Near the altar, the arches are styled in the fashion of the Italian Renaissance.

The pews are crafted from pine and painted to look grained in order to resemble oak, capped with black walnut. It is complemented by the communion rail, made of black walnut with oak spindles. The Stations of the Cross around the side are carved painted reliefs set in wooden frames. Brown metal plaques, covering the original German text, describe each one. Around the church are four separate altars, most in white with gilded trim. Atop one altar are carved wooden statues of four saints—Isaac Jogues, Elizabeth Ann Seton, John Neumann and Kateri Tekakwitha—all of whom had at least a tangential connection to the church during their lives.

Above the gallery are statues and paintings of other architectural elements. Combined, they create the impression of a clerestory. On the ceiling is painted a further trompe-l'œil.

== History ==
St. Mary's traces its heritage to the earliest days of Catholic missionary work in the New World. After formally becoming a church late in the 18th century, it went through two buildings in the 19th century to accommodate a population increased by immigration before the construction of the current building.

=== 1643–1797: Establishment of Catholicism in Albany ===
In 1643, Albany was still the small Dutch colonial outpost of Fort Orange. That year, visiting Mohawks brought a French captive along on one of their visits. He was a Jesuit priest, Isaac Jogues, who had come to them earlier as a missionary. Anticipating that Jogues would likely be killed by his captors, Arent van Curler helped the priest to escape, hiding him in his barn until a deal could be reached and the Frenchman put on a ship to take him downriver to New Amsterdam. This event is the earliest recorded presence of the Catholic Church in Albany. Jogues would later return to the Mohawk Valley, and three years later, he and two other missionaries were killed by the Mohawks at Ossernenon. They were all later canonized by the church as three of the North American Martyrs.

Later in the century, Fort Orange became the English city of Albany. Its citizens, reflecting the city's Dutch and English background, were predominantly Protestant, but among them were a small group of Catholics. By 1794, almost two decades after American independence, there were enough Catholics to ask the Vatican for permission to buy land to build a church. Two years later, the congregation formally incorporated, becoming the second Catholic church in the state, after St. Peter's in New York.

The parishioners had been celebrating Mass at the homes of their prosperous members. The first order of business for the new church's board of trustees was to find land and build a church. Plans for a modest building were drawn up, but land had not been found. In 1797, the city donated to the church the property where Jogues had hidden on his escape, and where the parish has been located ever since. The cornerstone was laid shortly thereafter.

=== 1798–1828: First church ===
The first St. Mary's Church building opened for services in late 1798. It was a plain brick building 50 feet (15 m) square with no belfry and a pyramidal roof with a cross. Above the main door, the entablature contained a plaque with the name of the builders and a skull and crossbones. Inside were two galleries, one of which contained what is believed to be the first organ installed in a church in Albany. It was the first church dedicated to the Virgin Mary in the state of New York, and the second permanent Catholic church built in the state.

At the time, the church's parish covered almost all of upstate New York, south to Poughkeepsie and north to what is today the Canada–US border (when the northern country was still known as British North America), and west as far as Rochester. Its second pastor, Matthew O'Brien, helped establish St. Mary's within Albany society by giving homilies of such quality that they attracted Protestant leaders from Albany and elsewhere in the state.

St. Mary's was part of the Diocese of Baltimore, but only for three years. Pope Pius VII created the Diocese of New York in 1801. It took another 15 years to seat a bishop. The church's congregation continued to grow slowly, reaching 300 by 1820. Newer parishes were established in other cities in the Capital District and Mohawk Valley.

Church lore holds that Marquis de Lafayette, French hero of the Revolutionary War, attended Mass on one or both of his visits to Albany during his 1824–25 American tour, but no contemporary newspaper records that he did. Later in 1825, the church was among the many that took part in official ceremonies marking the opening of the Erie Canal, which had a great impact on St. Mary's, as the canal and the industrialization that it spurred brought many Catholic immigrants, particularly from Ireland, to the city and the region. In Albany, St. Mary's was initially enough for them, but in other cities, they established their own churches, and the parishes with them, diminishing St. Mary's to Albany and its immediate vicinity in the process.

In 1828 the church established its first Sunday school, taught in part by a Protestant volunteer. Later that year, the congregation asked Bishop John Dubois for assistance in recruiting nuns to run the school and take care of the parish's orphans. The Sisters of Charity of Emmitsburg answered the bishop's call and were soon running not only the Sunday school and an orphanage, but a separate parochial school as well.

=== 1829–1866: Second church ===
This growth was straining the church's available space, and plans were made to replace the 1798 building. Philip Hooker was commissioned to design a new building, one of his last non-residential structures. His Federal style structure had brick walls and columns, faced in stucco, with a three-stage bell tower.

Among the many contributors to the $12,000 ($363,000 in 2025 dollars) construction cost were Stephen Van Rensselaer III, a former lieutenant governor descended from the Dutch family that had owned and governed most of the Albany area as patroons during the colonial era, and another former lieutenant governor of Dutch extraction, Martin Van Buren, later elected President of the United States. Services continued at a nearby school while the new church was under construction. To support the larger building, it was necessary to cut into the hillside and extend Steuben Street past Chapel Street.

The new church was completed and opened within a year. A few years later, the church was able to acquire a 1,300-pound (590 kg) bell, its first, for the tower. In 1836 the new church's space served both it and the city well when Albany was struck by the first of several cholera epidemics it experienced in the 19th century. Father Charles Smith, the pastor, devoted great time and effort to tending to the victims. With his assistance, the nuns opened a separate orphanage for the children of victims.

Later in 1836, the church received some important figures in the history of American Catholicism. In June, a newly ordained priest, John Neumann, celebrated a Mass at St. Mary's on the way to his first assignment in Western New York; he would later serve as the first Bishop of Philadelphia and was canonized in 1977. Less than a week later, Bishop Dubois visited to confirm 150 people, including some adults. Accompanying him was Father Charles Constantine Pise, the only Catholic priest to ever serve as United States Senate Chaplain.

Immigration to Albany continued, bringing more Catholics, including some from Germany, to the city. In 1837, the city's second Catholic church, St. John's, was founded in the South End. St. Mary's parish, which still included the entire city, was divided to accommodate the new congregation. The 1843 establishment of St. Joseph's in the Ten Broeck Triangle led to another reduction in parish territory. A parish that had occupied most of the state 20 years earlier was now limited to a single Albany neighborhood.

The new bishop, John Hughes, came into conflict with the trustees of St. Mary's and some of the other new churches upstate over their poor financial management and large debts. "What should belong to the present and the future is already mortgaged to the past!" he complained, predicting that "[s]ooner or later, the trustee system as it exists will destroy or be destroyed by the Catholic religion." The church hierarchy was also disturbed by rumors that the St. Mary's trustees had used some Masonic rites, contrary to Catholic doctrine, when they blessed the new church in 1829. Hughes later sent his coadjutor bishop, John McCloskey, to Albany to resolve the issues. He moved to dissolve the trustees and place the churches under direct diocesan supervision. The trustees at first resisted, but in 1845 formally voted to dissolve themselves. Two years later, at Hughes' request, Pope Pius IX subdivided the upstate portion of the diocese into the new dioceses of Albany and Buffalo.

McCloskey was installed as the first bishop of the new diocese. For a time, he utilized St. Mary's as his procathedral. However, he felt it inadequate to the task, and soon began raising money for a proper cathedral. In 1848, construction began one mile (1.6 km) to the south on the Cathedral of the Immaculate Conception, designed by Irish immigrant Patrick Keely. McCloskey moved his seat to the new cathedral when it was complete in 1852. St. Mary's primacy among Albany's Catholic churches has since then been purely historical.

The years before and after 1850 posed many challenges to the city. In 1848 a fire destroyed 600 buildings, and two more cholera epidemics struck Albany in 1849 and 1854. An assistant priest at St. Mary's founded the local chapter of the Society of Saint Vincent de Paul after the fire to help the victims. The church was also threatened by the rise of the nativist, anti-Catholic Know Nothing Party, which polled very well in Albany's 1855 municipal elections. Several members of the congregation who had become prominent in the community spoke out against the Know Nothings, and in 1859 the exiled Irish nationalist leader William Smith O'Brien, a Protestant, broke a self-imposed pledge of neutrality to condemn them while speaking at St. Mary's.

That same year another new parish, St. Patrick's, was created from territory formerly part of St. Mary's. During the Civil War in the early 1860s, structural defects in the church, possibly a result of its speedy construction three decades earlier, became apparent. Clarence A. Walworth, a converted Episcopal priest who took over as St. Mary's pastor after the war, made the construction of a new church his priority. Before that, he invited a friend and fellow Episcopalian convert, Isaac Hecker, founder of the Paulist Fathers, to the church to give a lecture.

=== 1867–1900: Third church and Walworth ===
New York had amended its laws on the organization of nonprofit institutions during the Civil War, and Walworth took advantage of this to reincorporate the church in a way more amenable to Catholic governance. The new board of trustees consisted of the bishop, Vicar General, and two lay members. The cornerstone of the new structure was laid in 1867 before a crowd that included Governor Reuben Fenton. The pews were removed, and a fair was held to raise money in the empty 1829 church.

Money came from many different sources. Prominent state and local politicians, some of them Protestants, made contributions. As with the second church, the architect, the firm of Nichols & Brown, was local; their design used the Romanesque Revival mode with an emphasis on the Italian interpretation of that style, reflecting the influence of another group of immigrants coming to Albany's parishes, Italians. It recalls the churches of Central Italy, particularly in the cities of Assisi and Perugia, many of which are similarly built into sloping hillsides.

The new church was completed in 1869, at a cost of $100,000 ($2.42 million in 2025 dollars). Walworth himself designed the original altar, now the Altar of Reservation, and its baptismal font. The Stations of the Cross had been purchased from a church in Germany five years earlier; bronze plaques with their English names cover the original German. Bishop John J. Conroy presided over the church's consecration that year. A year later, his Vicar General, Edgar Wadhams, another longtime friend of Walworth's, presided over the consecration of a new marble altar, donated by state historian Edmund O'Callaghan, a parishioner.

Wadhams returned to St. Mary's in 1872, along with John McCloskey, now Archbishop of New York, for another consecration. This time, McCloskey consecrated Wadhams as the first bishop of the newly created Diocese of Ogdensburg, split off from the Albany diocese's northern reaches. Three years later the church joined others in Albany and New York in celebrating McCloskey's elevation to cardinal, the first American-born priest to attain that rank. For St. Mary's, where McCloskey had briefly presided upon his arrival in Albany, there was the added element of a personal role in his success.

Ten years later, the church celebrated again when Daniel Manning, once one of its former altar boys, was appointed Secretary of the Treasury by President Grover Cleveland. Walworth, an advocate for the converted Mohawk populations of the state, argued for the sainthood of Kateri Tekakwitha, informally known as Lilly of the Mohawks, before the Third Plenary Council of Baltimore in 1884; the council voted to open the case for sainthood, leading to her eventual canonization by Pope Benedict XVI in 2012, the first Native American to be so honored.

In 1886 Walworth's research and historical knowledge were put to work for the city of Albany when he served on its bicentennial committee. As part of the celebrations, plaques were placed on the church and over 40 other buildings. At a special Mass attended by Catholic Mohawks, Walworth traced the history of the Church in Albany from Isaac Jogues' escape on the site of St. Mary's to the present. He served a single two-year term. In 1892, Walworth told Bishop Francis McNeirny that his failing health and increasing blindness made it impossible for him to carry on his pastoral duties alone. He continued as the church's rector; his assistant John Dillon was named parish administrator and vice rector.

Walworth's influence continued after he left active ministry. The two towers originally planned for the church were not built during the initial construction, owing to a shortage of funds at the time. On one of his trips to Germany, Walworth had seen a church with a single open-belfry tower capped by an angel supporting a weathervane; he believed the design would be perfect for St. Mary's and paid for an architect to design one during the 1870s. A renovation project that began in 1891 ended with the new 175-foot (53 m) tower in 1895.

Walworth paid for the statue of the angel Gabriel on the top of the tower himself. Electricity and lighting were also installed, making St. Mary's the first church in Albany with that amenity, and the new bishop, Thomas Burke, presided over the reopening service. The church's interior decorator hired an Italian painter to do the works on the ceiling and walls since they could now be seen more easily.

Burke returned two years later for the church's 1897 centennial celebration. He was joined by Archbishop Sebastiano Martinelli, Apostolic Delegate, or ambassador, of the Holy See to the United States, in celebrating a Pontifical Mass. A parade in front of the church culminated in fireworks in the evening. It was called "the greatest religious demonstration held thus far in Albany's history."

=== 1900–1937: 20th century ===
Walworth died in 1900. He was buried in his family plot in Saratoga Springs, but the next year a well-attended secular memorial to him was held at the local Odd Fellows' hall. In 1912, the church's original stained glass windows were removed and put in storage.

Pope Benedict XV appointed Edmund Gibbons bishop of Albany in 1919. The St. Mary's community took pride in this accomplishment, as Gibbons had been an altar boy at the church and been confirmed there. Accordingly, he chose St. Mary's for his first confirmation Mass as bishop. In 1924, the church celebrated The Rev. John Dillon's 50 years of service to it with an altar to St. John the Baptist, his patron saint.

In 1929, Dillon established the Church of St. Philip the Apostle on Sheridan Avenue as a mission church within the parish. Two years later, he opened a school in a building nearby, operated by members of the Sisters of the Holy Spirit and Mary Immaculate, dedicated to the education of the African American community. In its first year, 40 students were enrolled.

Dillon died three years later, in 1934. He was replaced by Thomas Loughlin. In 1937, a new rectory was built north of the church; at some point later, a garage was added to its rear. Brick was used for both structures so they would be sympathetic with the church.

=== 1938–present ===
In 1955, Pope Pius XII named Loughlin a domestic prelate, being granted the title of "monsignor"; he was the first pastor of St. Mary's named as such. Four years later, the first annual Red Mass for lawyers and judges was held at St. Mary's due to its proximity to the state, county, and city government buildings of downtown Albany. When it was held in the following years, Fulton Sheen, Bishop of Rochester, gave the homily.

By the early 1960s, the parish's numbers had declined. St. Philip's school, along with the parish's St. Mary's School, were closed in 1962 due to the enrollment difficulties that created, which were expected to worsen due to proposed urban renewal. The latter's building, Centennial Hall, was sold to the county in 1964.

The latter years of the 20th century were devoted to renovating the church. In 1978, a freestanding altar, made in Venezuela, was added. The church's bells were reactivated in 1980; six years later, an electrical system replaced the rebuilt wheel as the bell ringer due to the vibrations it created. In 1982, the paintings inside were restored. Outdoor spotlights were installed the following year to illuminate the tower and statue of Gabriel atop it. The pews and communion rails were restored seven years later, removing the black stain that had built up on them over time. For the church's bicentennial in 1997, an electronic organ capable of playing the long-dormant chimes was installed. Inside, the interior walls were refinished, and the columns and altar regilded.

== Services ==
Mass is currently celebrated daily at 12:05pm, and on the weekend at 4:00pm Saturday, 8:00am and 10:30 am on Sunday.

Confessions are heard on Monday, Wednesday, and Friday from 11:30 until 11:50, and Saturdays from 3:15 to 3:45pm.

== See also ==
- National Register of Historic Places listings in Albany, New York
