= Thomas Cusack =

Thomas Cusack may refer to:

- Thomas Cusack (politician) (1858–1926), U.S. Representative from Illinois
- Thomas Cusack (bishop) (1862–1918), American clergyman of the Roman Catholic Church
- Thomas Cusack (Irish judge) (1490–1571), Anglo-Irish judge and statesman
- Tom Cusack (born 1993), Australian rugby union player
