= Roman Catholic Diocese of Albany =

Latin Catholic jurisdiction in New York state, US

Diocese of Albany Diœcesis Albanensis

Catholic
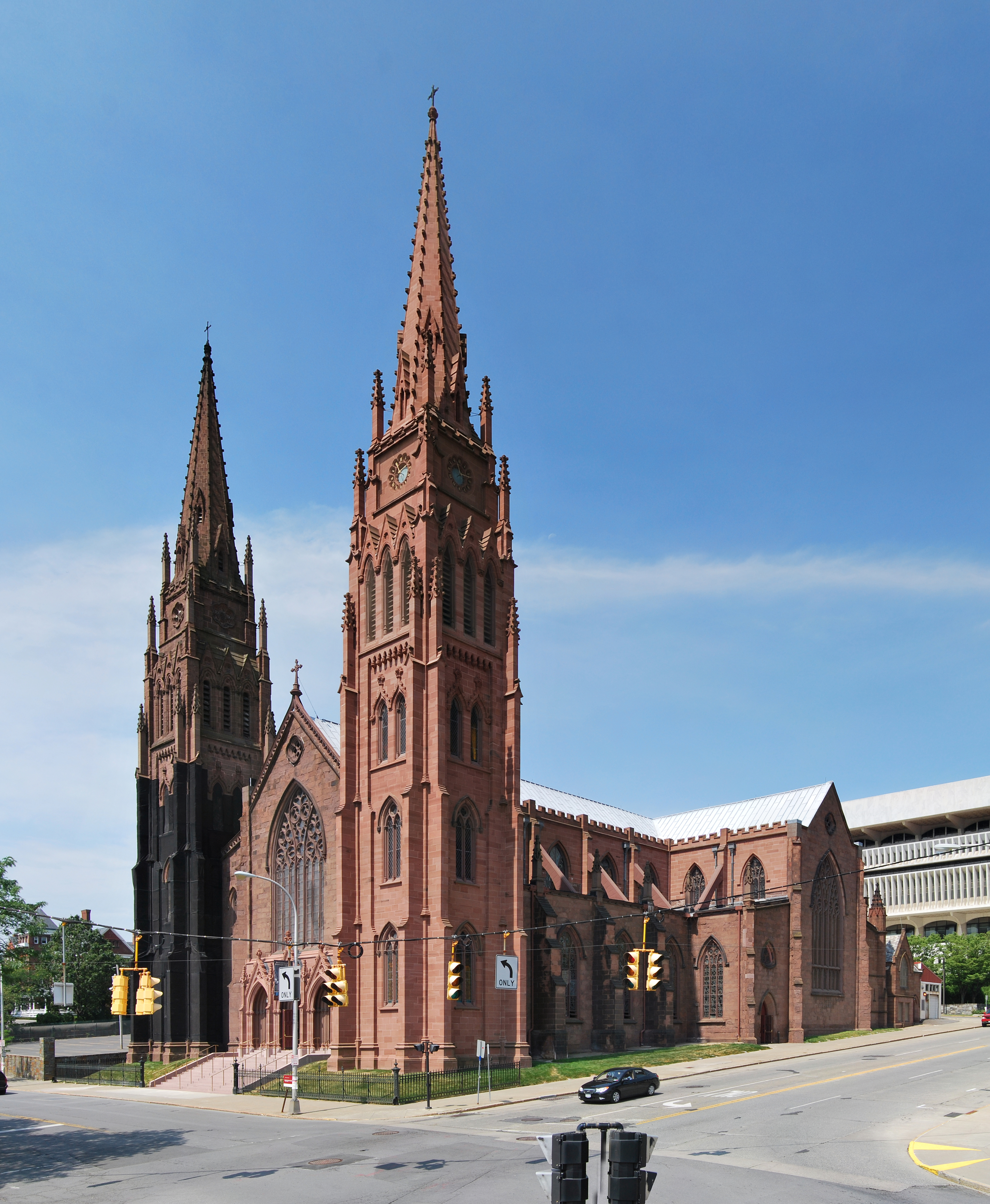
- Cathedral of the Immaculate Conception

- Coat of arms

Location
- Country: United States
- Territory: New York counties of Albany, Columbia, Delaware, Fulton, southern Herkimer, Greene, Montgomery, Otsego, Rensselaer, Saratoga, Schenectady, Schoharie, Warren, and Washington
- Episcopal conference: United States Conference of Catholic Bishops
- Ecclesiastical region: Region II
- Ecclesiastical province: New York
- Deaneries: 14
- Headquarters: 40 North Main Avenue, Albany, New York, 12203
- Coordinates: 42°39′06″N 73°45′16″W

Statistics
- Area: 10,419 sq mi (26,990 km^{2})
- Population: Total; Catholics: (as of December 2012); 1,392,464; 330,000 (23.7%)
- Parishes: 129 (with 4 apostolates)
- Schools: 28

Information
- Denomination: Catholic Church
- Sui iuris church: Latin Church
- Rite: Roman Rite
- Established: April 23, 1847; 179 years ago by Pope Pius IX
- Cathedral: Cathedral of the Immaculate Conception
- Patron saint: St. Mary

Current leadership
- Pope: Leo XIV
- Bishop: Mark O'Connell
- Metropolitan Archbishop: Ronald Hicks
- Vicar General: Robert Longobucco
- Bishops emeritus: Edward Scharfenberger

Map
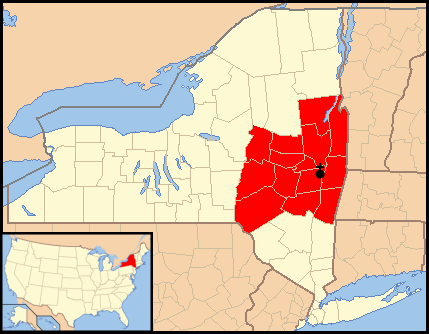

Website
- rcda.org

Bishop of Albany
- Bishopric

catholic
- Incumbent; Edward Scharfenberger

Location
- Ecclesiastical province: Archdiocese of New York

Information
- First holder: John McCloskey
- Established: April 23, 1847; 179 years ago
- Diocese: Diocese of Albany
- Cathedral: Cathedral of the Immaculate Conception (Albany, New York)

Website
- http://www.rcda.org

The Diocese of Albany (Latin: Diœcesis Albanensis) is a diocese of the Catholic Church in eastern New York in the United States. Its mother church is the Cathedral of the Immaculate Conception in Albany. It is a suffragan diocese of the Archdiocese of New York.

== Territory ==
The Diocese of Albany covers the following counties: Albany, Columbia, Delaware, Fulton, Greene, southern Herkimer, Montgomery, Otsego, Rensselaer, Saratoga, Schenectady, Schoharie, Warren, and Washington.

== History ==
=== 1600 to 1800 ===
During the Dutch rule of present-day New York State in the 17th century, Catholics were allowed in the colony of New Amsterdam. However, only Dutch Reformed Churches were permitted to operate. In the Albany region, the first Catholic presence was that of French missionaries in the 1640s attempting to evangelize the Mohawk peoples of the Haudenosaunee (Iroquois Confederation). Three missionaries were killed by the Mohawks, one near present-day Auriesville in 1642 and two at Lake George in 1646. They were later declared martyrs of the Catholic Church.

Great Britain took over New Amsterdam in 1664. During the next century, colonial governors of the Province of New York imposed bans on Catholic churches and restricted Catholics from holding public offices. Richard Coote, the first colonial governor, passed a law at the end of the 17th century that mandated a life sentence to any Catholic priest. The penalty for harboring a Catholic was a £250 fine plus three days in the pillory.

In 1676, Kateri Tekakwitha, a young Mohawk woman living near present-day Auriesville, asked to be baptized as a Catholic. She spent the rest of her life working with native converts at a mission on the St. Lawrence River in New France. Tekawitha was canonized in 2012.

Anti-Catholic bias in New York abated during the American Revolution when Catholic France provided its support to the American rebels. After the approval of the New York Constitution in 1777, freedom of worship for Catholics was guaranteed. This was soon followed by the same guarantee in the US Constitution.

In 1784, the Vatican erected the Prefecture Apostolic of United States of America, covering the entire new nation. This action was necessary to remove American Catholics from British jurisdiction. St. Mary's Church was established in Albany in 1796, making it the only Catholic Church in Upstate New York and the second Catholic church in the state after St. Peter's in New York City. The Vatican converted the prefecture into the Diocese of Baltimore in 1789. It was the first diocese in the United States, covering the entire country.

=== 1800 to 1850 ===
Nine years later, as the US population grew, the Vatican in 1808 created several new dioceses, including the Diocese of New York. Upstate New York would be part of the Diocese of New York, followed by the Archdiocese of New York, for the next 39 years.

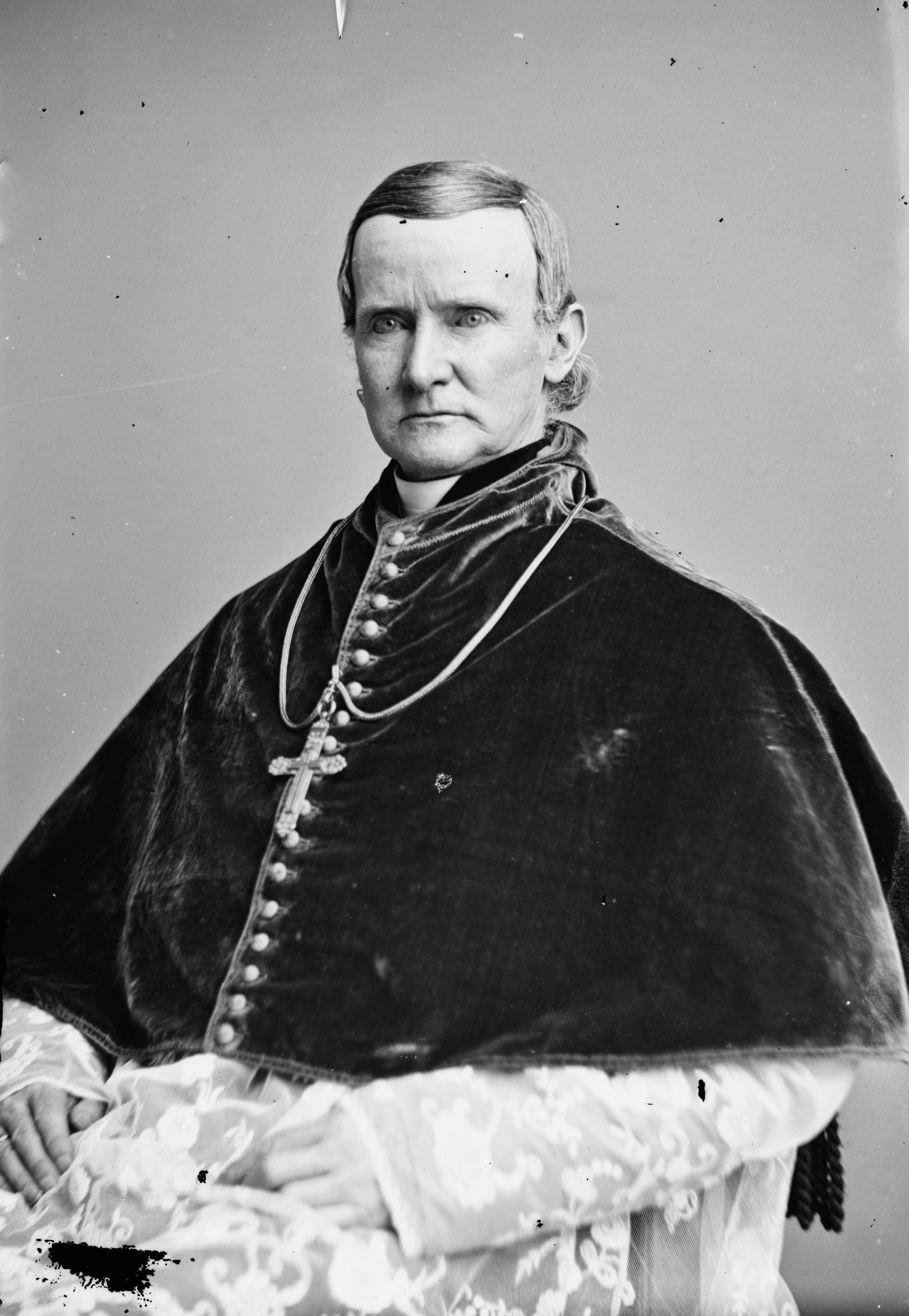
Bishop McCloskey (pre-1865)

In 1817, Irish immigrants began moving to the Albany area to build the Erie Canal. The industry that grew around the canal terminus in Albany attracted even more immigrants. Catholic immigrants began settling in the Capital District and the Mohawk Valley, establishing churches in these areas.The first parish in Troy was St. Peter's, erected there in 1824 to serve Irish Catholics.

Irish immigration to the Albany region increased in the later 1840s due to the Great Famine in Ireland.In 1839, St Peter's Parish opened in Saratoga Springs to serve Irish and Italian immigrants, the first parish in that community.

In 1847, Pope Pius IX erected the Diocese of Albany, taking its territory from the Diocese of New York. He named Coadjutor Bishop John McCloskey from New York as the first bishop of Albany, designating St. Mary's Church in Albany as his pro-cathedral. At that time, the new diocese covered 30,000 square miles (78,000 km^{2}) over eastern and central New York, with a population of 60,000 Catholics. It contained 25 churches served by 34 priests, along with two orphanages and two free schools.

Due to the efforts of Reverend Peter Havermans, Troy Hospital opened in Troy in 1848. It later became St. Mary's Hospital and is today Samaritan Hospital. Saint John the Evangelist Parish was erected in Rensselaer in 1851, the first parish there.

=== 1850 to 1900 ===
McCloskey dedicated the Cathedral of the Immaculate Conception in Albany in 1852. During his tenure, he increased the number of parishes to 113 and the number of priests to eight. Three boys academies, one girls academy, four orphanages, and fifteen parochial schools also opened.

McCloskey in 1854 opened the St. Vincent’s Male Orphan Asylum in Albany. To pay for it, he also established a boys academy in Albany that is today Christian Brothers Academy.St. Peter's Academy was founded in Saratoga Springs in 1862. It is today Saratoga Central Catholic High School. McCloskey in 1864 founded St. Joseph's Provincial Seminary in Troy.It is today St. Joseph's Seminary and College, located in Yonkers.

Pius IX named McCloskey as archbishop of New York in 1864. In the next year, the pope appointed John J. Conroy, vicar general of the diocese, as the second bishop of Albany.During Conroy's tenure, the number of priests increased; he secured the services of the Augustinians and the Conventual Franciscans. Conroy founded an industrial school for boys in Albany. The first parish in Schenectady, St. John's, was founded for Irish immigrants in 1865.

The diocese opened St. Agnes's Cemetery in Menands in 1867. Four members of the Religious Sisters of Mercy established St. Peter's Hospital in Albany in 1869. Conroy built a motherhouse for the Little Sisters of the Poor when they arrived in Albany in 1871.

In 1871, Pius IX selected Francis McNeirny of New York to serve as coadjutor bishop in Albany to assist Conroy. The next year, the pope erected the Diocese of Ogdensburg, taking northern New York from the diocese. When Conroy resigned in 1877, McNeirny became the next bishop.

McNeirny recruited the Dominican Tertiaries, the Sisters of the Good Shepherd, and the Redemptorist Fathers to come to the diocese. In 1880, he allowed Sister Lucy Smith to found the Dominican Sisters of St. Catherine de' Ricci, a diocesan religious community. In 1884, a priest erected the shrine of Our Lady of Martyrs in Auriesville, dedicated to the French priests killed during the 1640s. Two years later, the Vatican erected the Diocese of Syracuse, taking Central New York from the Diocese of Albany.

McNeiry died in 1894. That year, Thomas Martin Aloysius Burke of Albany was appointed the fourth bishop of Albany by Pope Leo XIII. During his administration, Burke enlarged the Boys' Asylum in Albany, reduced the diocesan debt, and renovated the cathedral.

=== 1900 to 2000 ===
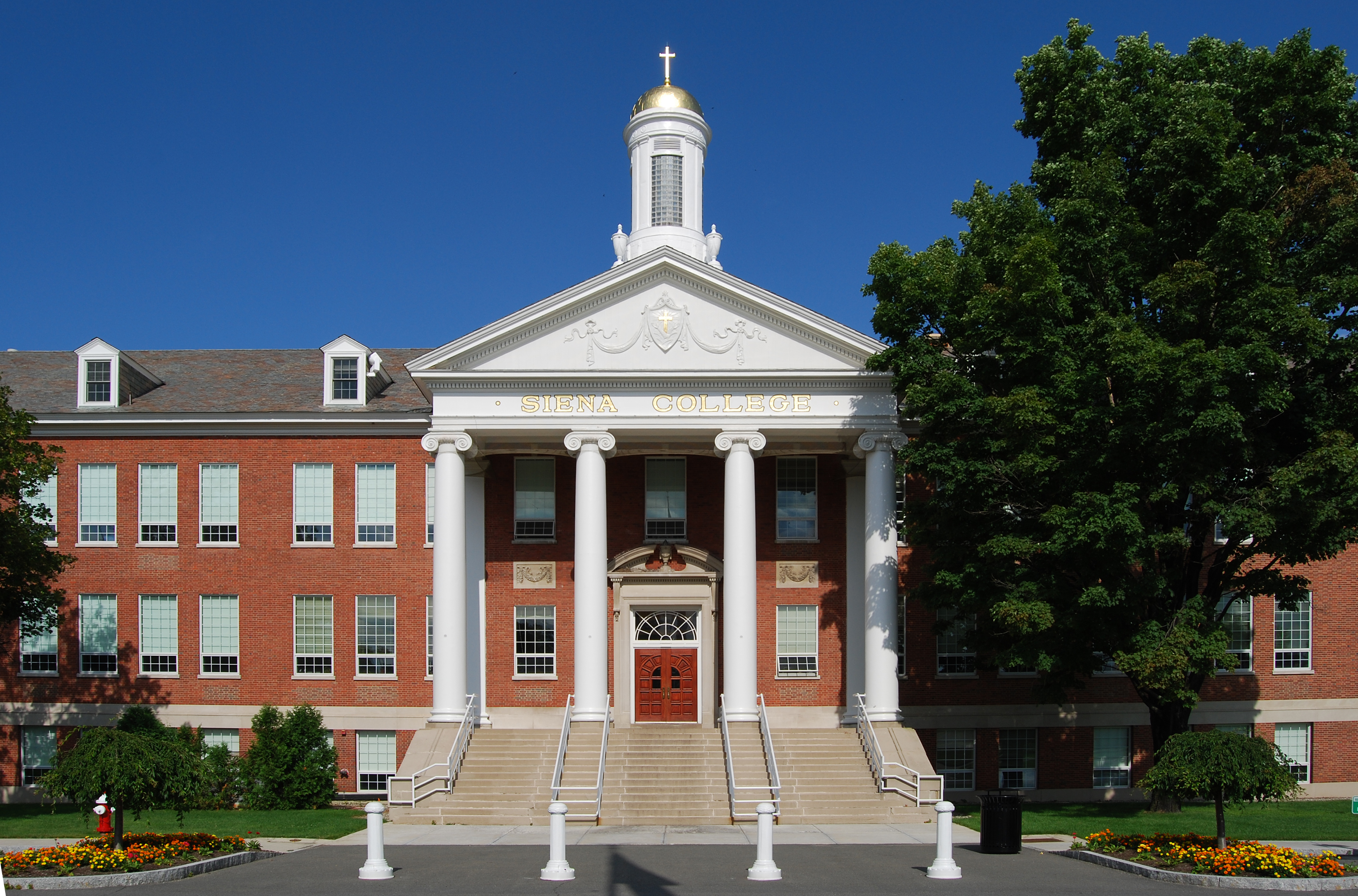
Siena College, Colonie, New York (2014)

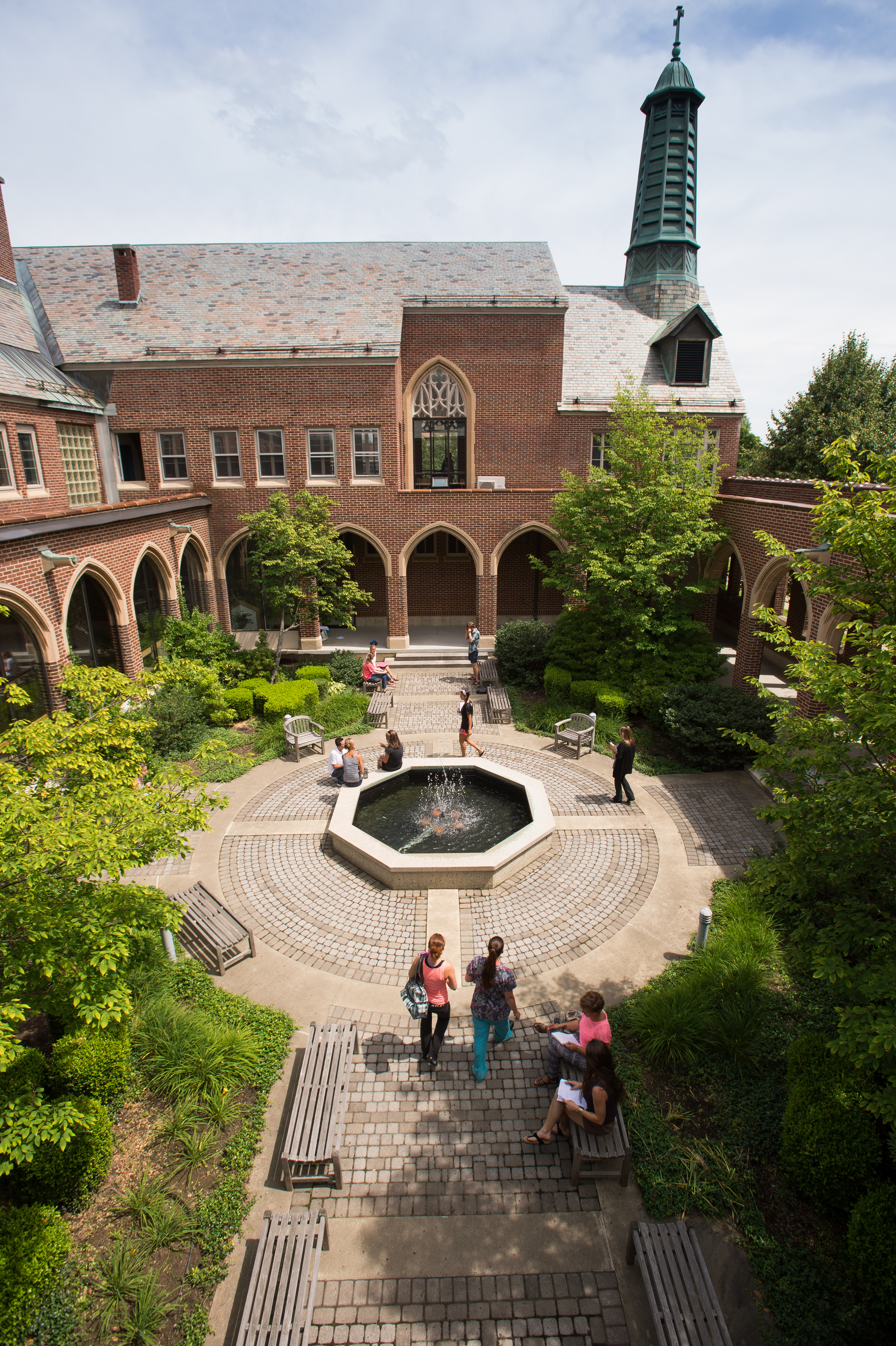
Maria College of Albany (2014)

After Burke died in 1915, Auxiliary Bishop Thomas Cusack of New York was named the fifth bishop of Albany by Pope Benedict XV. After the American entry into World War I in 1917, Cusack supported the war effort. He added electric lighting and marble flooring to the cathedral and established a Catholic Charities chapter in the diocese. Cusack died in 1918.

Reverend Edmund Gibbons from the Diocese of Buffalo was the next bishop of Albany, appointed by Benedict XV in 1919. Seeing a need for a women's college in the region, the Sisters of Saint Joseph of Carondelet opened the College of Saint Rose in Albany in 1920. Gibbons established the Mater Christi Seminary in Albany, 22 high schools, 82 primary schools, and the diocesan newspaper, The Evangelist. The Order of Friars Minor opened Siena College for men in Loudonville in 1937.

In 1945, William Scully of New York was appointed coadjutor bishop of Albany by Pope Pius XII to assist Gibbons. In 1949, the diocese dedicated St. Clare's Hospital in Schenectady, to be operated by the Poor Sisters of St. Francis.When Gibbons retired in 1954, Scully became bishop of Albany. In 1955, he founded an annual appeal for funds to support diocesan education and welfare programs. He established 13 parishes, 21 elementary schools, six high schools and a nursing home. The Religious Sisters of Mercy founded Maria College in Albany in 1958 to prepare women to join their order. Scully died in 1969.

Pope Paul VI appointed Auxiliary Bishop Edwin Broderick of New York as the eighth Bishop of Albany in 1969. Resigning in 1976, Broderick became the executive director of Catholic Relief Services. To replace Broderick, Paul VI named Howard Hubbard as bishop of Albany in 1977, the first Albany native to hold that post.

In 1986, Hubbard held a Palm Sunday service of reconciliation between Christians and Jews at the cathedral. Over 1,200 guests, both Christian and Jewish, attended the service. During the event, Hubbard "expressed contrition and remorse for the centuries of anti-Jewish hostility promulgated under the Catholic Church's auspices." Portal, a sculpture placed outside the cathedral in 1989, commemorates the 1986 service.

=== 2000 to present ===
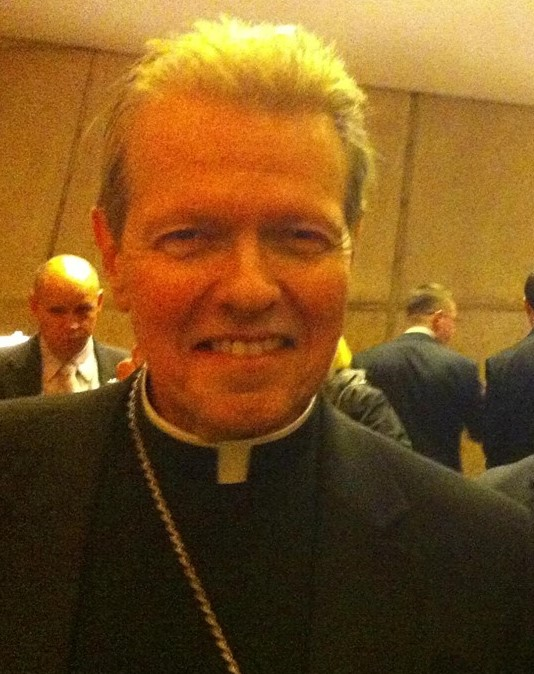
Bishop Scharfenberger (2014)

After Hubbard retired in 2014, Pope Francis named Reverend Edward Scharfenberger of the Diocese of Brooklyn as the next bishop of Albany. In 2018, Scharfenberger celebrated the feast day of Our Lady of Walsingham with Dean Leander Harding at the Episcopal Cathedral of All Saints in Albany. Scharfenberger told the congregation of Catholics and Episcopalians that the two denominations shared more similarities than differences. In June 2019, at a mass at St. Mary's Church, the diocese celebrated the 20th anniversary of its use of the extraordinary form mass.

In September 2019, the AARP Foundation sued the diocese on behalf of a group of retired former employees of St. Clare's Hospital, which had closed in 2008. The lawsuit alleged mismanagement of the hospital pension plan, which the diocese terminated in 2018. Many pensioners lost all their benefits, with the rest receiving only partial benefits.

In May 2022, New York Attorney General Letitia James sued the diocese on behalf of all 1,100 former St. Clare's employees. A state investigation discovered that over several decades, the diocese had told employees that it was fully funding the St. Clare pension plan. In reality, the diocese was underfunding it, making only the legal minimum contributions. As of 2024, the case was still unresolved.

The St. Clare court case was delayed when the diocese filed for Chapter 11 bankruptcy in March 2023. In April 2023, the U.S. Government Accountability Office (GAO) announced an investigation into the St. Clare pension fund. The US Conference of Catholic Bishops in January 2025 announced that the Our Lady of Martyrs Shrine was now designated as a national shrine. The diocese in April 2025 announced a planning initiative to deal with the huge financial costs of many of its parishes. It was expected to result in many parish closures and mergers.

=== Cathedral of the Immaculate Conception ===
At his first retreat for diocesan clergy, Bishop McCloskey raised over $5,000 to start a building fund for a cathedral in the diocese. He commissioned architect Patrick Keely, the builder of many Catholic churches in the United States, to design the new building. Over 10,000 onlookers watched the laying of the cathedral cornerstone in 1846. It was dedicated in 1852. The final project cost was $250,000 ($9.68 million adjusted for inflation).

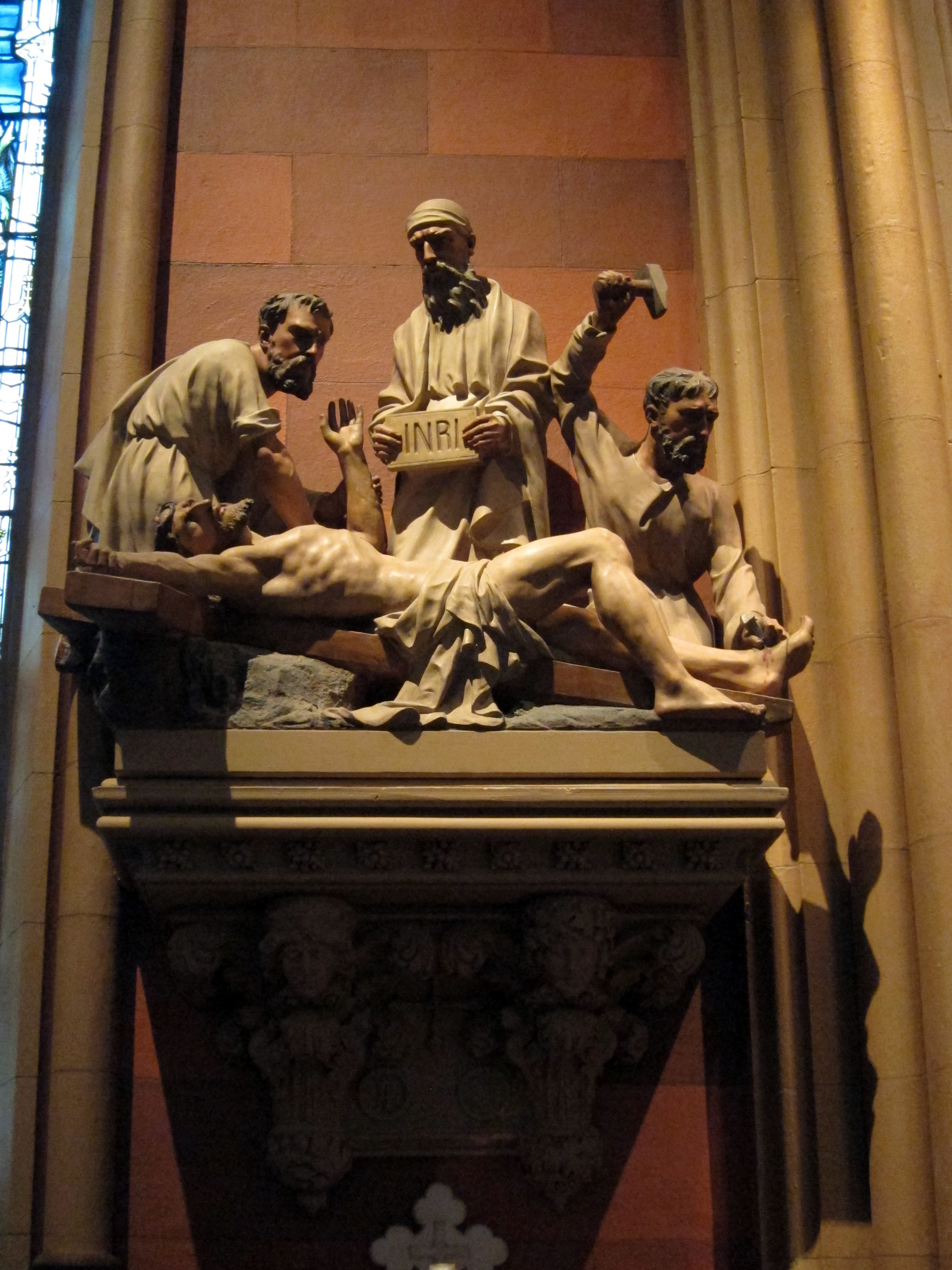
Station of the Cross XI, Cathedral of the Immaculate Conception (2012)

The diocese completed the north tower spire in 1862. Its 210-foot (64 m) height made it the city's tallest building for many years. The cathedral bells were cast at the Meneely Bell Foundry in West Troy; they were first rung on the Feast of the Immaculate Conception that same year. The diocese added the south tower spire in 1888 and in 1892 the apse and sacristies. In 1902, Bishop Burke consecrated the cathedral on its 50th anniversary.

The diocese initiated a $19 million cathedral restoration project in the 21st century, completing it in 2010. The cathedral was rededicated on its 158th anniversary later that year. Over 1,000 people attended the rededication mass, celebrated by Bishop Hubbard, Archbishop Timothy Dolan and Cardinal Edward Egan.

=== Clergy abuse scandal and bankruptcy ===
In 2004, the Diocese of Albany reported that 19 priests had committed acts of sexual abuse over the previous 53 years. It also said that it was investigating allegations of sexual abuse involving ten current and former priests.

In 2011, Hubbard placed three retired priests on administrative leave and removed a fourth priest from ministry after receiving allegations of child sexual abuse. That same year, the diocese created the Independent Mediation Assistance Program to financially assist anyone abused as a minor by a diocesan priest or employee. Hubbard later acknowledged that the diocese used to secretly send clergy accused of sexual abuse away for treatment rather than report them to police; he expressed regret for that practice.

James Taylor, pastor of Saint Kateri Tekakwitha Parish in Niskayuna, was arrested in April 2014 on charges of endangering the welfare of a minor. He was accused of sending inappropriate photos to a 15-year-old girl in Round Lake, as well as texting her and making unforced physical contact. The diocese immediately removed Taylor from ministry. He pleaded guilty in October 2014 and was fined $1,000.In March 2023, the diocese announced its plan to file for Chapter 11 bankruptcy in the face of numerous sexual abuse lawsuits.

=== Priest shortage ===
In 1960, the Diocese of Albany had more than 400 priests. In 2016, the diocese had more retired (90) than active (85) priests. In 2021, in the northern part of the diocese, one priest was assigned to twelve parishes.

== Parishes ==
As of 2026, the Diocese of Albany has 126 parishes, four apostolates, and 157 worship sites, serving 325,000 Catholics.

== Bishops ==
Six bishops of Albany are buried in a crypt beneath the Cathedral of the Immaculate Conception.

=== Bishops of Albany ===
1. John McCloskey (1847–1864), appointed Coadjutor Bishop of New York and subsequently succeeded to see (elevated to Cardinal in 1875)
2. John J. Conroy (1865–1877)
3. Francis McNeirny (1877–1894; coadjutor bishop 1872–1877)
4. Thomas Martin Aloysius Burke (1894–1915)
5. Thomas Cusack (1915–1918)
6. Edmund Gibbons (1919–1954)
7. William Scully (1954–1969; coadjutor bishop 1945–1954)
8. Edwin Broderick (1969–1976)
9. Howard J. Hubbard (1977–2014)
10. Edward Scharfenberger (2014–2025)
11. Mark O'Connell (2025–present)

=== Auxiliary Bishops of Albany ===
Edward Joseph Maginn (1957–1972)

=== Other diocesan priests who became bishops ===
- Francis Patrick McFarland, appointed Bishop of Hartford in 1858
- Edgar Philip Prindle Wadhams, appointed Bishop of Ogdensburg in 1872
- Patrick Anthony Ludden, appointed Bishop of Syracuse in 1886
- Bernard Joseph Mahoney, appointed Bishop of Sioux Falls in 1922
- John Joseph Thomas Ryan, appointed Archbishop of Anchorage in 1966 and later Archbishop for the Military Services, USA
- Matthew Harvey Clark, appointed Bishop of Rochester in 1979
- Harry Joseph Flynn, appointed Coadjutor Bishop of Lafayette in Louisiana in 1986 (later succeeded to see) and later Coadjutor Archbishop and Archbishop of Saint Paul and Minneapolis
- John Gavin Nolan, appointed Auxiliary Bishop for the Military Services, USA in 1987
- Joseph Walter Estabrook, appointed Auxiliary Bishop for the Military Services, USA in 2004

== Education ==
As of 2026, the Diocese of Albany has two middle/high schools and nine pre-K/elementary/middle schools.

Diocesan Secondary Schools
School	Location	Grades
Notre Dame-Bishop Gibbons School	Schenectady	6-12
Saratoga Central Catholic School	Saratoga Springs	6-12

== Shrines ==
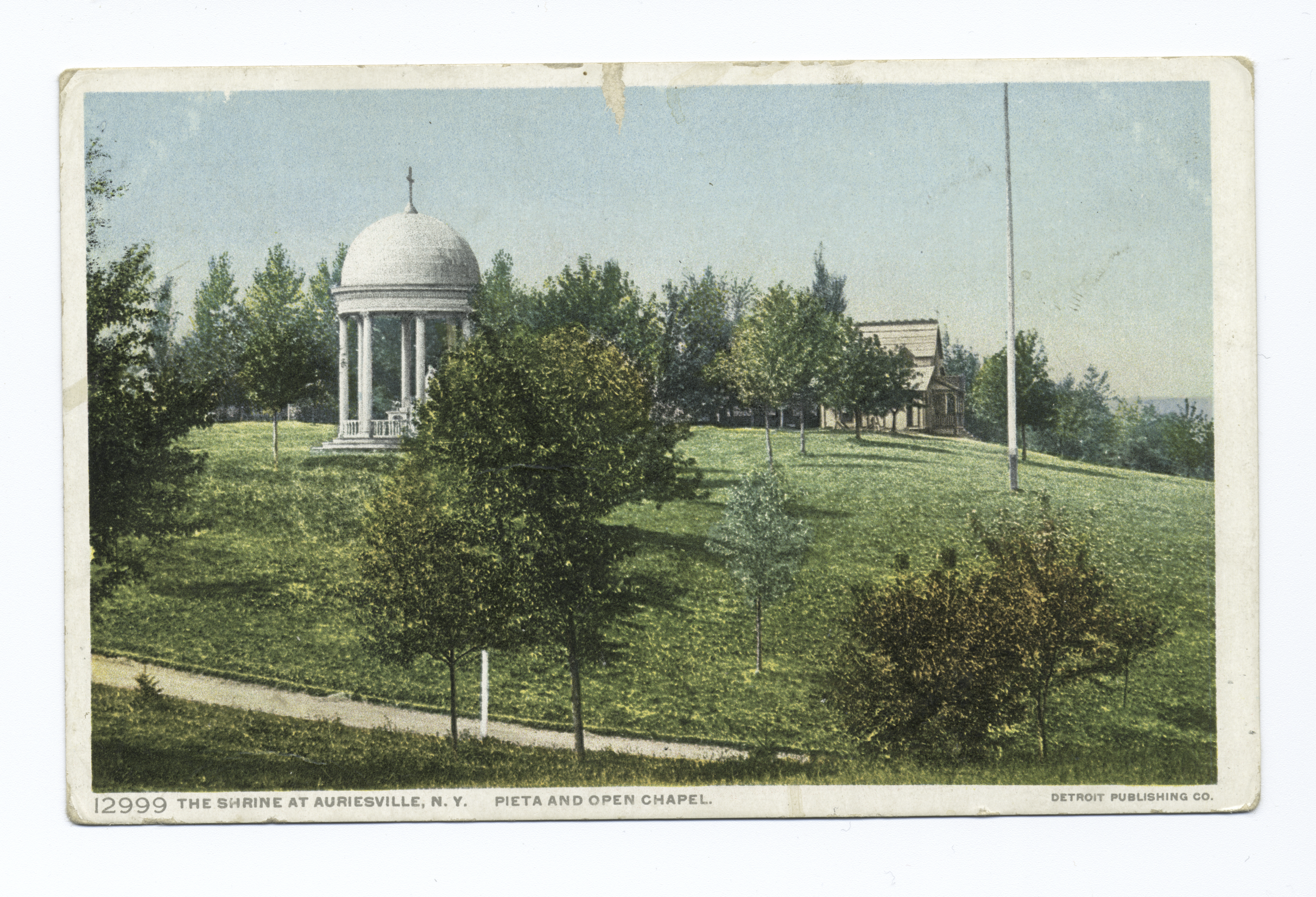
National Shrine of Our Lady of the North American Martyrs, Auriesville, New York (1898)

- St. Kateri Tekawitha National Shrine and Historical Site – Fonda
- National Shrine of the North American Martyrs – Auriesville
