= Saratoga Central Catholic High School =

Catholic middle and high school in Saratoga Springs, New York, U.S.

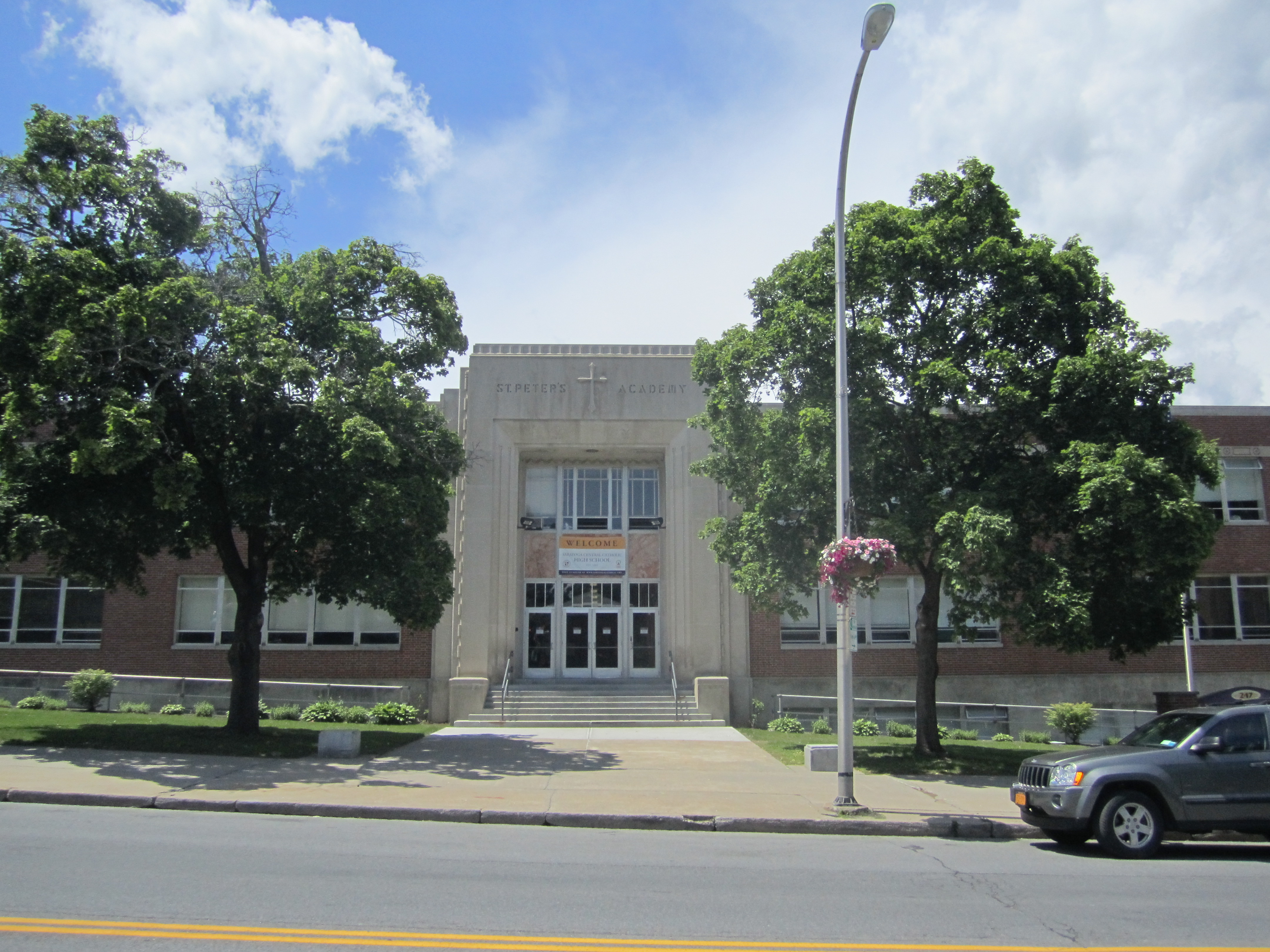
- Saratoga Catholic in 2013

Location
- 247 Broadway; Saratoga Springs, (Saratoga County), New York 12866; United States
- 43°4′37″N 73°47′13″W

Information
- Type: Private
- Motto: Omnia Pro Deo (All for God)
- Religious affiliation: Roman Catholic
- Patron saint: St. Peter
- Established: 1862; 164 years ago
- Authority: Roman Catholic Diocese of Albany
- CEEB code: 335050
- Chairperson: Daniel Kumlander
- Principal: Christopher Signor ’84
- Teaching staff: 24.5 (FTE) (2021–22)
- Grades: 6–12
- Gender: Coeducational
- Enrollment: 193 (2021–22)
- Student to teacher ratio: 7.9 (2021–22)
- Campus type: small suburb
- Colors: Purple and Gold
- Athletics conference: WASAREN
- Sports: Cross country; golf; volleyball; soccer; basketball; bowling; baseball; track and field; softball
- Mascot: Saints
- Accreditation: Cognia
- Tuition: $7,380 (6-8), $9,830 (9-12) $13,500 (International Students)
- Feeder schools: St. Clement's (Saratoga Springs); St. Mary's (Ballston Spa); St. Mary's-St. Alphonse's (Glens Falls); St. Mary's (Amsterdam)
- Website: www.saratogacatholic.org

Saratoga Central Catholic High School is a private, Roman Catholic high school and middle school located in Saratoga Springs, New York. It is located within the Roman Catholic Diocese of Albany. The 2021–2022 enrollment is 202 students. Tuition for the 2021–2022 school year is $7,380 (6–8) and $9,830 (9–12).

== Background ==
Saratoga Central Catholic was established in 1862. It was established as Saint Peter's Academy and later changed to its current name in 1976. It is the only Catholic high school in Saratoga County. Grades 7 and 8 were added in 1989 and Grade 6 was added in 2006. While Saratoga Central Catholic is situated next to and was formerly named after the Church of St. Peter, it is officially affiliated with St. Clement's Parish in downtown Saratoga Springs.

== Athletics ==
Saratoga Central Catholic offers a total of 9 sports including, Cross Country, Golf, Volleyball, Soccer, Basketball, Bowling, Baseball, Track and Field, Softball. All play on the varsity level, with Track and Field, Cross Country, Golf and Bowling being Co-Ed.
