= Edward Joseph Maginn =

American Roman Catholic bishop (1897–1984)

Edward Joseph Maginn (January 4, 1897 – August 21, 1984) was a Roman Catholic bishop.

Born in Glasgow, Scotland, Maginn was ordained to the priesthood on July 27, 1922. On June 27, 1957, Maginn was named titular bishop of Curium and auxiliary bishop of the Roman Catholic Diocese of Albany, New York. Maginn was consecrated bishop on September 12, 1957, and retired on July 8, 1972.
