= Thomas Cusack (bishop) =

American clergyman

His Excellency, The Right Reverend Thomas Francis Cusack
- Bishop of Albany; Titular Bishop of Themiscyra
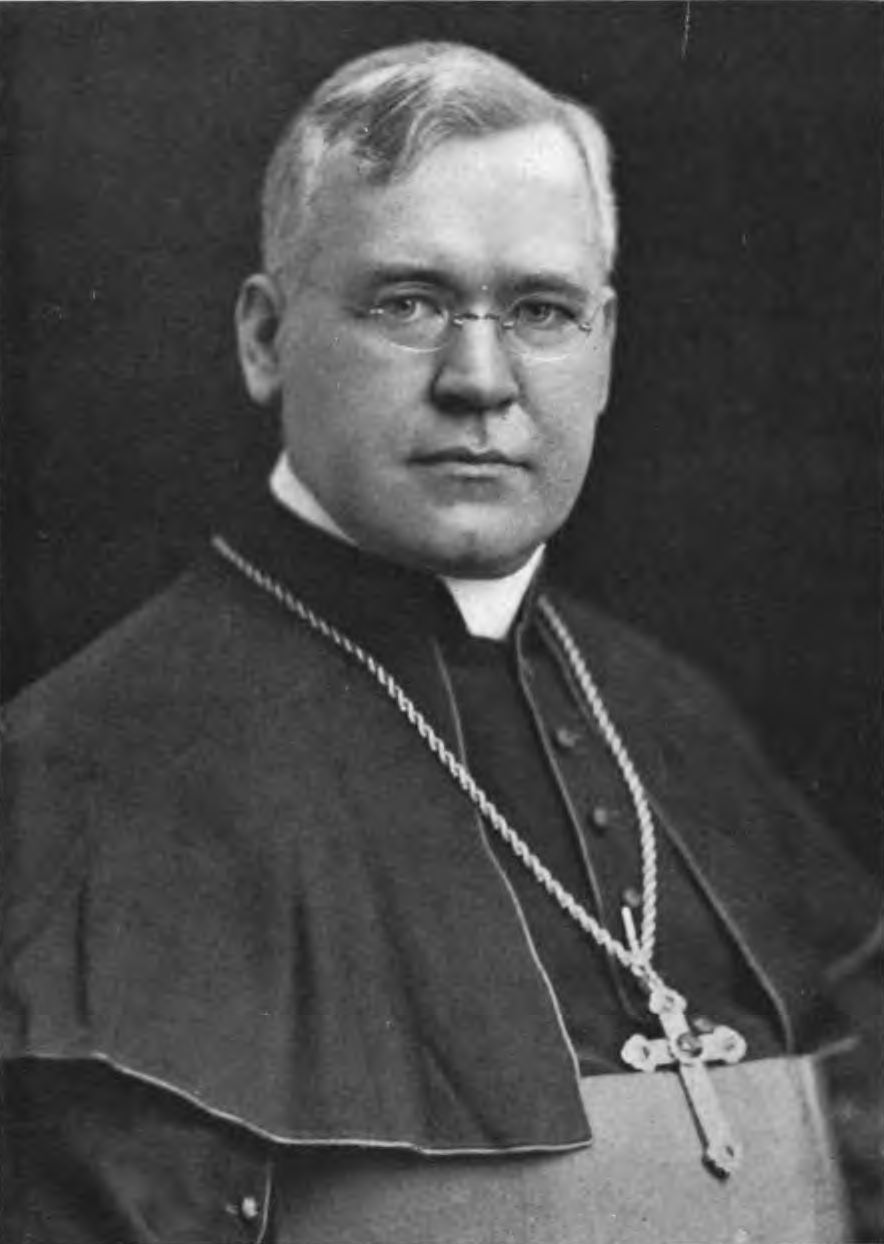
- Church: Roman Catholic Church
- See: Diocese of Albany
- Predecessor: Thomas Martin Aloysius Burke
- Successor: Edmund Gibbons
- Other post: Titular Bishop of Themiscyra
- Previous post: Auxiliary Bishop of New York

Orders
- Ordination: May 30, 1885 by Francis McNeirny
- Consecration: April 25, 1904 by John Murphy Farley, Charles H. Colton and James Augustine McFaul

Personal details
- Born: February 22, 1862 New York City, US
- Died: July 12, 1918 (aged 56) Albany, New York, US
- Education: St. Joseph's Provincial Seminary
- Motto: Alias oves habeo (I have other sheep)

Thomas Francis Cusack (February 22, 1862 – July 12, 1918) was an American prelate of the Roman Catholic Church. He served as bishop of the Diocese of Albany in New York from 1915 until his death in 1918. Cusack previously served as an auxiliary bishop of the Archdiocese of New York from 1904 to 1915.

== Biography ==
=== Early life ===
Thomas Cusack was born on February 22, 1862, in Manhattan to James and Honora (née Boland) Cusack. His parents were Irish immigrants who came to the United States on their honeymoon. His childhood was spent on the Lower East Side of Manhattan, where he attended the parochial school of St. James Parish.

Cusack then went to high school at St. Francis Xavier's College in Manhattan, graduating there in 1880. He continued his preparation for the priesthood at St. Joseph's Provincial Seminary in Troy, New York.

=== Priesthood ===
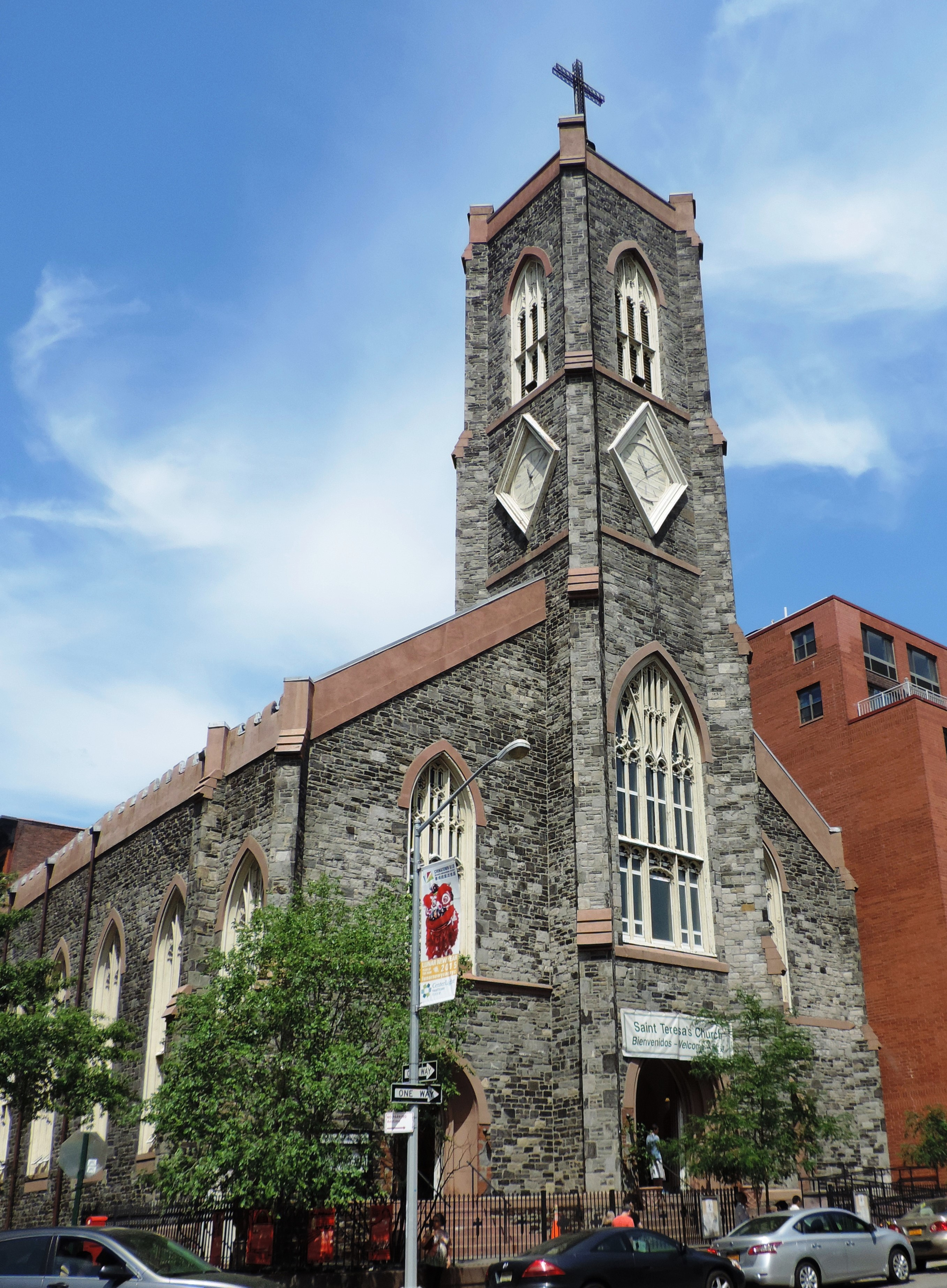
St. Theresa Church, Manhattan, New York City (2015)

Cusack was ordained to the priesthood at St. Joseph's for the Archdiocese of New York on May 30, 1885, by Bishop Francis McNeirny. After his 1885 ordination, the archdiocese assigned Cusack to the pastoral staff of St. Teresa's Parish in Manhattan.

Cusack left New York City in 1890 to serve as pastor of St. Peter's Church in Rosendale, New York. However, after one year, he resigned his post to go to Yonkers, New York to assist in establishing a new parish. According to the New York Times, Cusack played a prominent role in combating a smallpox epidemic in Yonkers.

In 1897, Cusack organized the missionary band for the archdiocese, a group of priests tasked with evangelizing non-Catholics. During the 1898 Spanish–American War, Cusack served as a military chaplain at Camp George H. Thomas, a US Army training camp near Chickamauga, Georgia.

=== Auxiliary Bishop of New York ===
On March 11, 1904, Cusack was appointed auxiliary bishop of New York and titular bishop of Themiscyra by Pope Pius X. He received his episcopal consecration on April 25, 1904, from Archbishop John Murphy Farley, with Bishops Charles H. Colton and James Augustine McFaul serving as co-consecrators, in St. Patrick's Cathedral in Manhattan.In addition to his episcopal duties, he served as pastor of St. Stephen's Church from 1904 to 1915.

=== Bishop of Albany ===
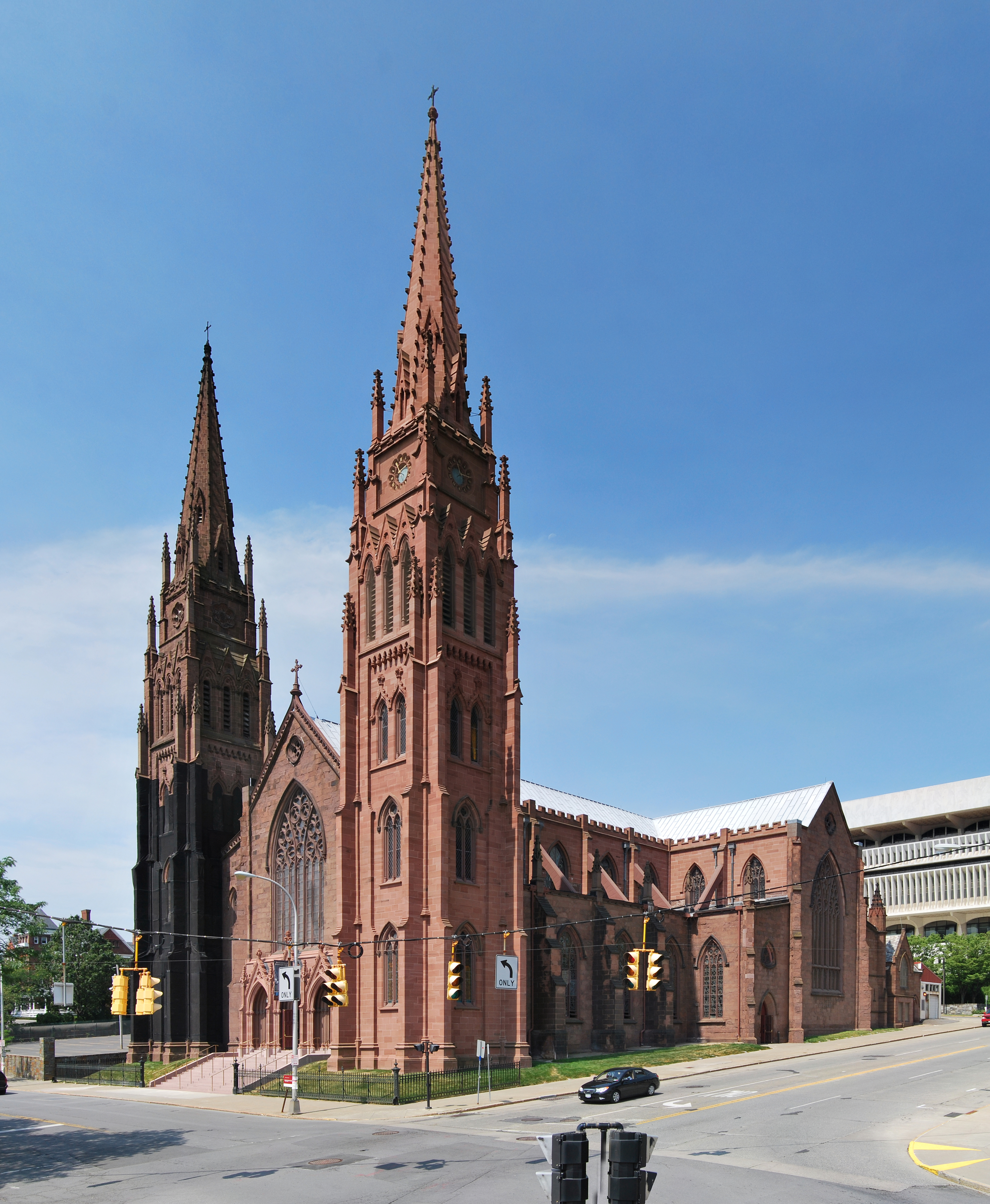
Cathedral of the Immaculate Conception, Albany, New York (2011)

Cusack was named the fifth bishop of Albany by Pope Benedict XV on July 5, 1915. During his brief tenure, Cusack supported the American war effort during World War I by helping provided military chaplains. He also renovated the Cathedral of the Immaculate Conception in Albany, installing electric lighting and marble flooring.

Cusack established a chapter of Catholic Charities in the diocese. Before his illness, Cusack took walks around Albany, talking with people that he met.

=== Death and legacy ===
By June 1917, Cusack was in poor health, but continued to work as bishop. He died in Albany on July 12, 1918, from cancer at age 56.

Catholic Church titles
| Preceded by Thomas Martin Aloysius Burke | Bishop of Albany; 1915–1918 | Succeeded by Edmund Gibbons |
| Preceded by – | Auxiliary Bishop of New York; 1904–1915 | Succeeded by – |
