= Clarence A. Walworth =

American lawyer

Clarence Augustus Walworth (May 30, 1820 – September 19, 1900) was an American attorney, writer, ordained Roman Catholic priest and missionary. Walworth was a well regarded writer who published numerous works related to the Roman Catholic Church.

== Life ==
Clarence A. Walworth, the fourth child and oldest son Reuben Hyde Walworth and Maria Ketchum (Averill) Walworth, was born on May 30, 1820, at Plattsburgh, Clinton County, New York.

He was educated at The Albany Academy, and graduated from Union College in 1838. Then he studied law, was admitted to the bar, and practiced in Canandaigua.

After a few years he abandoned the law, and instead studied theology at the General Theological Seminary in New York City. Before he completed his studies there, he decided to become a Catholic priest, entered the Congregation of the Most Holy Redeemer, and continued his studies in Belgium. From 1866 to 1892 he was pastor of St. Mary's Church in Albany.

In 1858 he translated the hymn Holy God, We Praise Thy Name from its German counterpart, Grosser Gott, wit loben dich. The work, a paraphrase of the Te Deum, became one of the most popular and enduring Catholic hymns in the English language.

== Critical reception ==
Walworth’s 1888 Andiatorocté; or, The Eve of Lady Day on Lake George and Other, Hymns, and Meditations in Verse was reviewed by Oscar Wilde:

“Andiatoroctè [sic] is the title of a volume of poems by the Rev. Clarence Walworth, of Albany, N. Y. It is a word borrowed from the Indians, and should, we think, be returned to them as soon as possible….Poems of this kind were popular in the Middle Ages when the cathedrals of every Christian country served as its theaters. They are anachronisms now, and it is odd that they should come to us from the United States. In matters of this kind we should have some protection.”

Walworth died September 19, 1900, in Albany, New York.
