= John McCloskey =

American Catholic prelate (1810–1885)

His Eminence John McCloskey
- Archbishop of New York
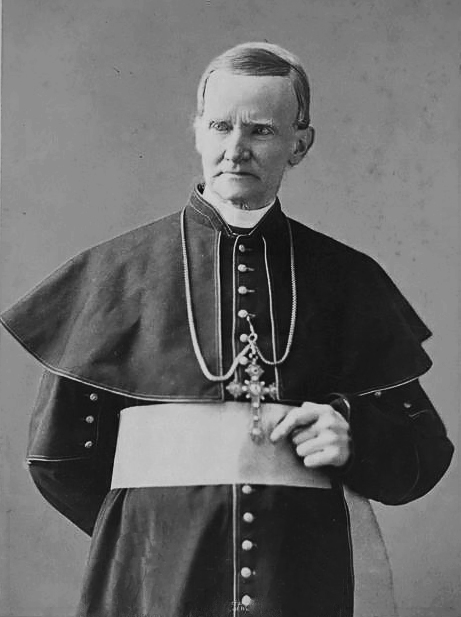
- McCloskey in 1876
- See: New York
- Appointed: May 6, 1864
- Term ended: October 10, 1885
- Predecessor: John Hughes
- Successor: Michael Corrigan
- Other post: Cardinal-Priest of S. Maria sopra Minerva
- Previous posts: Bishop of Albany (1847–1864); Coadjutor Bishop of New York (1843–1847)

Orders
- Ordination: January 12, 1834
- Consecration: March 10, 1844 by John Hughes
- Created cardinal: March 15, 1875 by Pius IX
- Rank: Cardinal priest

Personal details
- Born: March 10, 1810 Brooklyn, New York, U.S.
- Died: October 10, 1885 (aged 75) New York City, U.S.
- Education: Mount St. Mary's College
- Motto: In spem vitae aeternae (Latin for 'In hope of eternal life')
- Signature: John McCloskey's signature

Styles of John McCloskey
- Reference style: His Eminence; The Most Reverend Eminence
- Spoken style: Your Eminence
- Religious style: Cardinal
- Informal style: Cardinal

John McCloskey (March 10, 1810 – October 10, 1885) was an American Catholic prelate who served as the first American-born archbishop of New York from 1864 until his death in 1885.

McCloskey previously served as bishop of Albany in New York State (1847–1864). In 1875, McCloskey became the first American cardinal. He served as the first president of St. John's College, now Fordham University, from 1841 to 1842.

== Early life and education ==
John McCloskey was born on March 10, 1810, in Brooklyn, New York, to Patrick and Elizabeth (née Hassan) McCloskey, who had immigrated to the United States from County Londonderry in Ireland, shortly after their marriage in 1808. He was baptized by Reverend Benedict Joseph Fenwick on May 6, 1810, at St. Peter's Church in Manhattan. At that time, Brooklyn did not yet have a Catholic church, so the McCloskey family had to row across the East River to Manhattan to attend mass.

At age five, McCloskey was enrolled at a boarding school for boys in Brooklyn run by the retired English actress Charlotte Melmoth. Even in his advanced years, he attributed his distinct enunciation to his training there. He moved with his family to Manhattan in 1817, and then entered the Latin school run by Thomas Brady, father of attorney James T. Brady and Judge John R. Brady. Following his father's death in 1820, the family moved to a farm in Bedford, New York. He became the ward of Cornelius Heeney, a wealthy merchant and friend of the family.

The 11-year-old McCloskey, after a brief visit with Reverend John Dubois, entered Mount St. Mary's College in Emmitsburg, Maryland, in September 1821. As a student at Mount St. Mary's, McCloskey was described as having

"...won the admiration and esteem of his teachers and the respect and love of his college-mates by the piety and modesty of his character, his gentleness, and sweet disposition, the enthusiasm with which he threw himself into his studies, and his prominent standing in class."

In his graduating year, McCloskey delivered a speech on patriotism that doubled as a defense of the poet Horace's phrase, "It is sweet and fitting to die for one's country". Following his graduation in 1826, he returned to his mother's farm in Bedford.

During the spring of 1827 in Bedford, McCloskey was attempting to drive a team of oxen drawing a heavy load of logs when the wagon overturned, burying him under the logs for several hours. He was later discovered and taken to his house. For the next several days, McCloskey was unconscious. When he woke up, he was totally blind for a time.

During his convalescence, McCloskey decided to enter the priesthood. He returned to Mount St. Mary's in September 1827 for his seminary training. Although he regained his eyesight, he tired easily and suffered from poor health for the rest of his life. In addition to his studies, he began teaching Latin in 1829 at Mount St. Mary's. He received the tonsure, minor orders, and subdiaconate all from Bishop Francis Kenrick.

== Priesthood ==
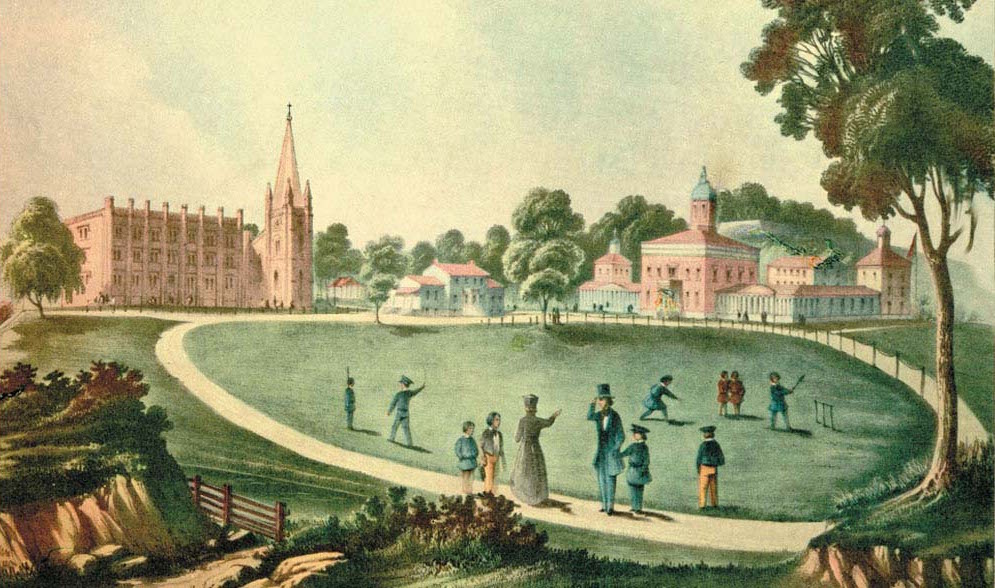
St. John's College, New York City (1846)

On January 12, 1834, McCloskey was ordained a priest for the Diocese of New York by Bishop John Dubois, at St. Patrick's Old Cathedral in Manhattan. He became the first native New Yorker to enter the priesthood from the diocese. After his ordination, the diocese assigned McCloskey as a parochial vicar at Old St. Patrick's Cathedral Parish and a chaplain at Bellevue Hospital in Manhattan. In February 1834, he was reassigned as a professor of philosophy and vice-president at the newly established St. Joseph's Seminary in Nyack, New York. However, the seminary was destroyed by a fire in August 1834.

By 1834, New York City was still suffering from a cholera epidemic than had broken out two years earlier. McCloskey wanted to minister to the sick, but Dubois was concerned for his health. He instead sent McCloskey to Rome to study at the Pontifical Gregorian University and University of the Sapienza (1834–1837). While in Rome, he befriended Reverend Père Lacordaire, and Cardinals Thomas Weld and Joseph Fesch.

Abandoning his pursuit of the degree of Doctor of Divinity in Rome, and departing from there in February 1837, he visited Germany, Belgium, France and England before returning to New York that summer. From August 1837 to March 1844, McCloskey served as pastor of St. Joseph's Parish in Greenwich Village in New York City. His tenure at the parish was initially contentious, with the parish trustees refusing to pay him a salary or furnish his house

As pastor, McCloskey showed particular concern for the needs of the homeless children living in Greenwich Village. In addition to his duties at St. Joseph's, McCloskey served as the first president of St. John's College in the Fordham section of the Bronx from 1841 to 1842, where he also taught rhetoric and literature.

== Episcopal ministry ==
=== Coadjutor Bishop of New York ===
In 1843, McCloskey returned full-time to St. Joseph's. Later that year he was appointed coadjutor bishop of New York and titular bishop of Axieri by Pope Gregory XVI. He received his episcopal consecration on March 10, 1844—his 34th birthday—from Bishop John Hughes, with Bishops Benedict Fenwick (who had baptized him as a child) and Richard Vincent Whelan serving as co-consecrators, at St. Patrick's Cathedral. According to author Rocco Palma, Hughes had a reputation for bombast and aggressiveness while McCloskey was considered more quiet and gentle. McCloskey busied himself primarily with a visitation of the entire diocese He was also instrumental in the conversion Catholicism of Isaac Hecker, founder of the Paulist Fathers, and of James Roosevelt Bayley, who later became archbishop of Baltimore.

=== Bishop of Albany ===
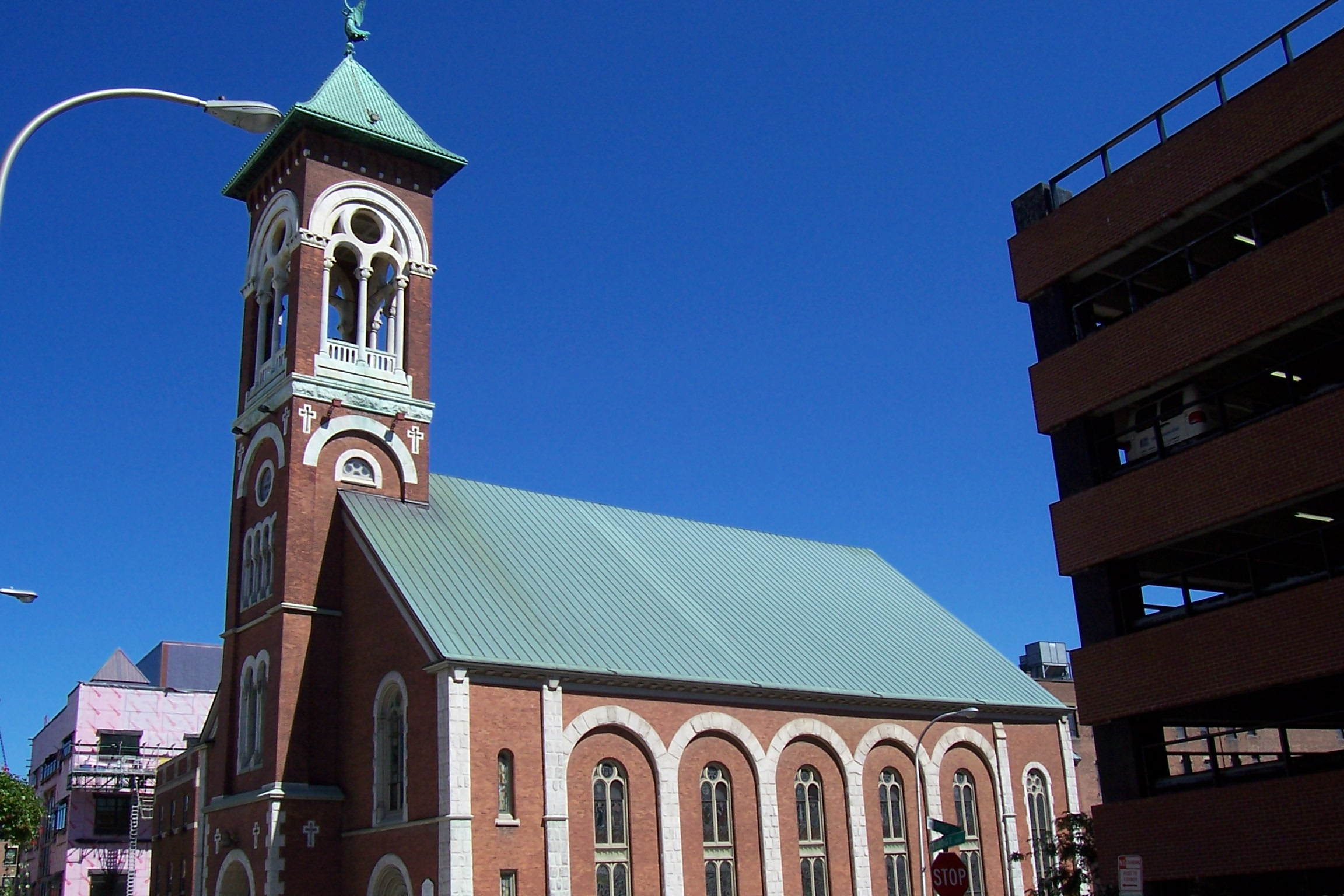
St. Mary's Church, Albany, New York (2005)

McCloskey was named the first bishop of the newly erected Diocese of Albany by Pope Pius IX on May 21, 1847. He was installed in Albany by Hughes on September 19, 1847. At the time of his arrival, the diocese covered 30,000 square miles (78,000 km^{2}) with 60,000 Catholics. It had 25 churches, 34 priests, two orphanages, and two free schools. McCloskey's flock was made up largely of poor, uneducated Irish immigrants fleeing the Great Famine in Ireland of 1845 to 1852.

McCloskey first selected St. Mary's Church in Albany as his episcopal see, but it soon proved unsuitable as a cathedral. McCloskey then started construction of the Cathedral of the Immaculate Conception in that city. The cornerstone was laid in July 1848 and its dedication took place in November 1852.

McCloskey attended the First Plenary Council of Baltimore in 1852, convened the first diocesan synod in October 1855, and was named an assistant at the pontifical throne by the Vatican in 1862. During his tenure in Albany, he increased the number of parishes to 113 and the number of priests to 84. He established three academies for boys and one for girls, four orphanages and 15 parochial schools. One significant accomplishment was the opening of St. Joseph's Provincial Seminary in Troy. McCloskey also introduced the Jesuits, Franciscans, Capuchins, Religious of the Sacred Heart, Sisters of Charity, Sisters of Mercy, Sisters of St. Joseph, and the De La Salle Christian Brothers into the diocese.

=== Archbishop of New York ===
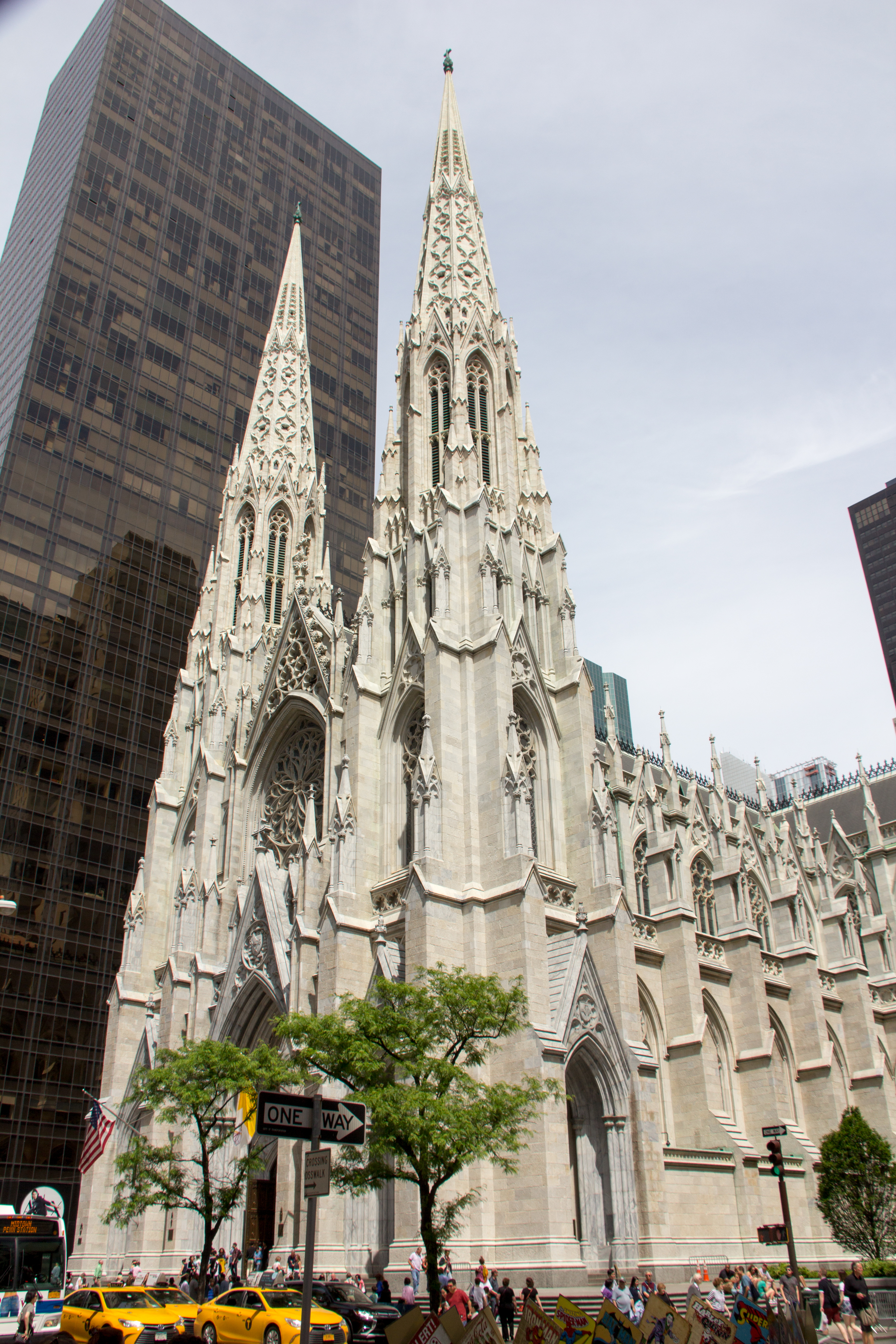
The current St. Patrick's Cathedral, Manhattan (2017)

Following Hughes' death in January 1864, McCloskey was widely expected to be named his successor. Distressed by the rumors, he wrote to Cardinal Karl von Reisach of the Congregation for the Propagation of the Faith, objecting, "I possess neither the learning, nor prudence, nor energy, nor firmness, nor bodily health or strength." However, Pius IX nevertheless appointed him as the second archbishop of New York on May 6, 1864 and McCloskey accepted the position.

Following the end of the American Civil War in 1865, McCloskey resumed the construction of the new St. Patrick's Cathedral in Manhattan, begun under his predecessor. In October 1866, McCloskey traveled to Baltimore to attend the Second Plenary Council of Baltimore, a meeting of all the bishops in the United States. Before the Council convened, he learned that the Old St. Patrick's Cathedral in New York had been gutted by a fire. McCloskey preached the sermon at the beginning of the first session.

After returning to New York, McCloskey met with the cathedral board of trustees. They immediately decided to rebuild the old cathedral; it was ready for Easter Sunday mass on April 21, 1867. The completed rebuilding project was completed by March 13, 1868, and McCloskey rededicated the cathedral rededicated four days later. McCloskey participated in the First Vatican Council in Rome from 1869 to 1870, and voted in favor of papal infallibility despite his feelings that such a declaration was "untimely." On December 8, 1873, he solemnly dedicated the archdiocese to the Sacred Heart of Jesus.

=== Cardinal ===
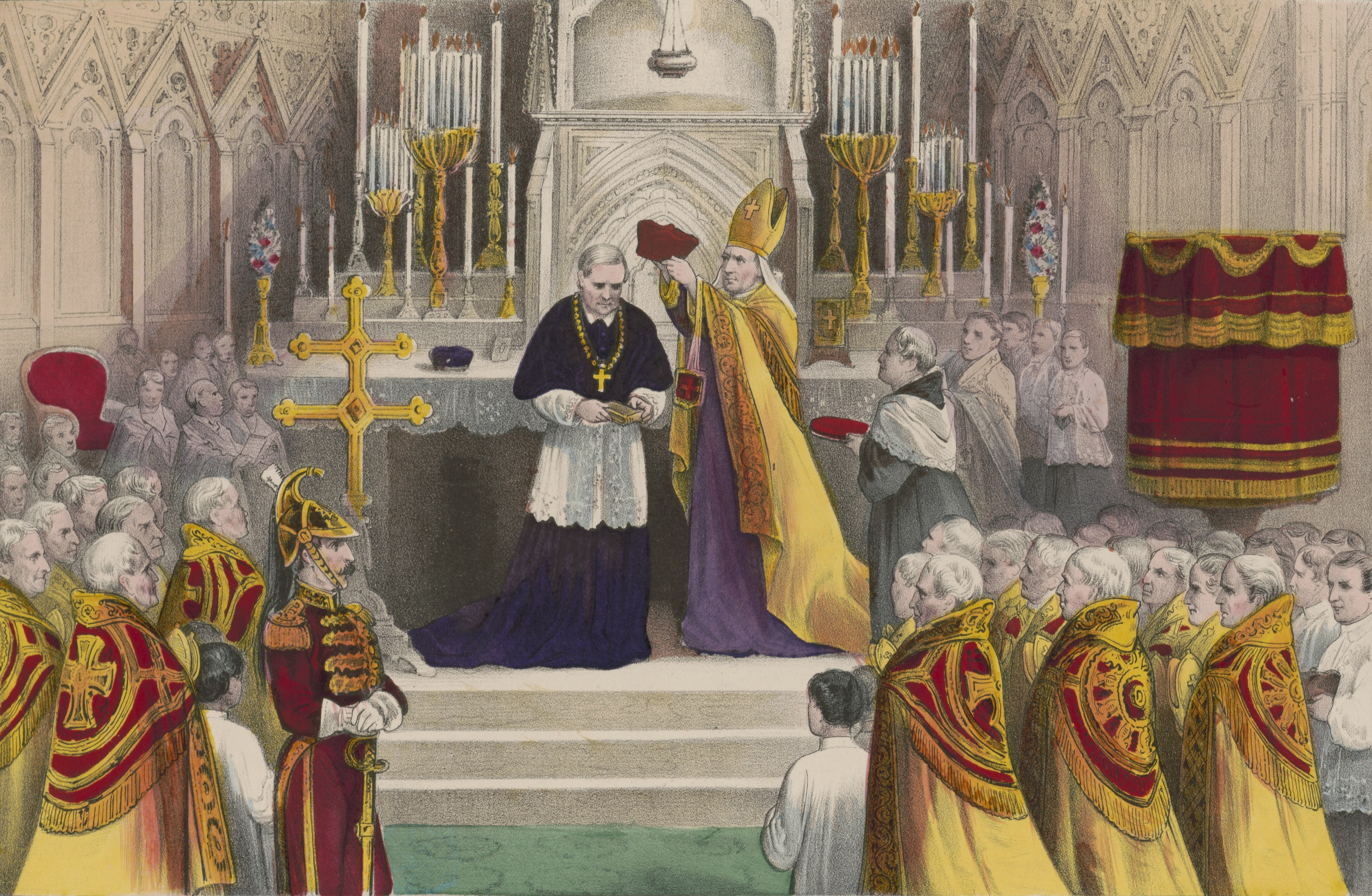
Imposing the Cardinal's Berretta, McCloskey (in black) receives the cardinal's biretta from Archbishop James Roosevelt Bayley (1875)

McCloskey was created cardinal-priest of the Basilica of Santa Maria sopra Minerva in Rome by Pius IX in the consistory of March 15, 1875, thus becoming the first American cardinal. The news of his elevation was well received by Catholics and non-Catholics alike, and was viewed as a sign of the growing prestige of the United States. He received the red biretta from Archbishop Bayley in a ceremony at the Old St. Patrick's Cathedral on April 27, 1875. At the ceremony, McCloskey declared,

"Not to my poor merits but to those of the young and already vigorous and most flourishing Catholic Church of America has this honor been given by the Supreme Pontiff. Nor am I unaware that, when the Holy Father determined to confer me this honor he had regard to the dignity of the See of New York, to the merits and devotion of the venerable clergy and numerous laity, and that he had in mind even the eminent rank of this great city and the glorious American nation."

Following the death of Pius IX in February 1878, McCloskey left for Rome but arrived too late to participate in the papal conclave that elected Pope Leo XIII. The new pope bestowed the red hat upon him on March 28, 1878. McCloskey dedicated the new St. Patrick's Cathedral in May 1879.

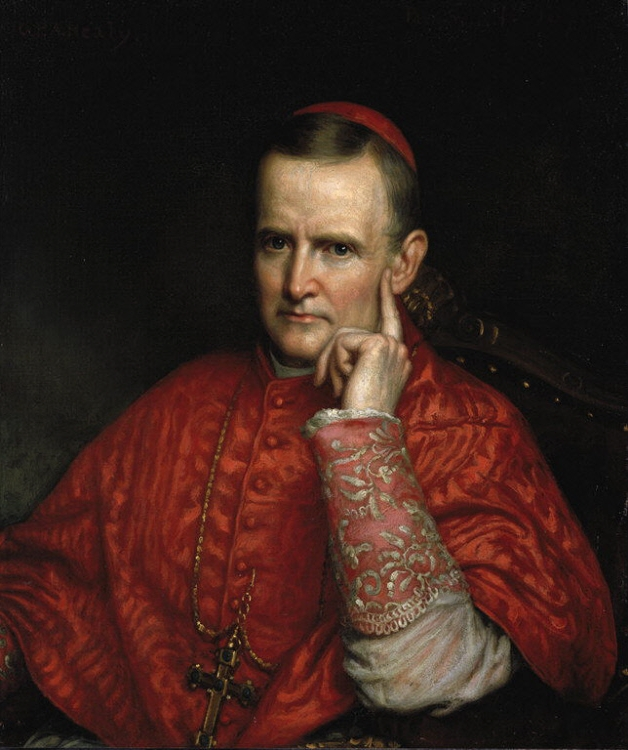
Portrait of McCloskey by George Peter Alexander Healy (1875)

During the later 1870s, Thomas Ewing Sherman, son of the American Civil War general William Tecumseh Sherman, told his father that he wanted to become a Jesuit priest. A very unhappy Sherman wrote to McCloskey in 1879, asking him to dissuade Thomas from this path. However, after talking with Thomas, McCloskey instead encouraged the boy to enter the priesthood. An enraged William Sherman, in a letter to a St. Louis, Missouri newspaper, blasted McCloskey, accusing him of taking away his son. When pressed for comment on Sherman's remarks by the newspaper's editor, McCloskey simply replied: "General Sherman's letter was marked 'personal and confidential.'" Thomas Sherman was ordained a priest in 1889.

In 1880, Leo XIII appointed Bishop Michael Corrigan of the Diocese of Newark, as coadjutor archbishop to assist McCloskey. McCloskey last major public appearance was in January 1884 for the Golden Jubilee celebration of his priestly ordination; Leo XIII sent him a jeweled chalice as a gift.

During 1884, the Government of Italy was threatening to expropriate church property, including the Pontifical North American College. In March 1884, McCloskey lobbied US President Chester A. Arthur and US Secretary of State Frederick T. Frelinghuysen to intervene with Italy, saving the college from seizure.

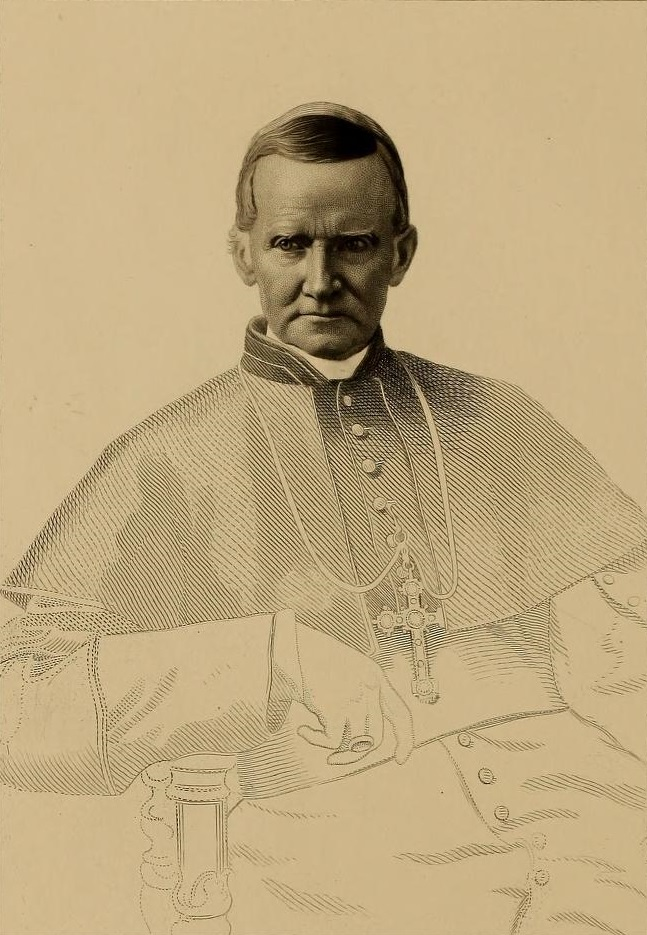
Lithograph of McCloskey (1878)

McCloskey's 21-year-long tenure as archbishop of New York was a productive one. In response to the growing Catholic population in New York, he established 88 additional parishes (for a total of 229) in the Archdiocese, 25 of them in Manhattan, four in the Bronx, and one in Staten Island; the remaining were established outside the city. Among these were the first parish for black Catholics as well as new churches for the growing Polish and Italian communities. The number of priests also rose from 150 to 400 during his tenure. An advocate of Catholic education, at the time of his death there were 37,000 children enrolled at archdiocesan schools. He established several charitable societies for children and a hospital for the mentally ill.

== Death ==
Throughout 1885, McCloskey suffered from bouts of fever, intense pain, loss of sight, and a recurrence of malaria. He also appeared to be suffering symptoms of what could have been Parkinson's disease. Within a few months, he was hospitalized

McCloskey died on October 10, 1885, at age 75 with his three nieces and his private secretary Monsignor John Farley at his bedside. His funeral mass was held at St. Patrick's Cathedral on October 25, 1885; during the eulogy, Archbishop James Gibbons described him as "a kind father, a devoted friend, a watchful shepherd, a fearless leader and, above all, an impartial judge." John McCloskey is interred under the main altar at St. Patrick's Cathedral.

Academic offices
| New office | President of Fordham University; 1841–1843 | Succeeded by John Harley, S.J. |
Catholic Church titles
| Preceded by Célestine Guynemer de la Hailandière | Titular Bishop of Axieri; 1843–1847 | Succeeded by Florentin-Étienne Jaussen, SS.CC. |
| New diocese | Bishop of Albany; 1847–1864 | Succeeded by John J. Conroy |
| Preceded by John Hughes | Archbishop of New York; 1864–1885 | Succeeded by Michael Corrigan |
| Preceded by Matteo Eustachio Gonella | Cardinal-Priest of Santa Maria sopra Minerva; 1875–1885 | Succeeded by Zeferino González, O.P |
