= Lucy Eaton Smith =

Roman Catholic nun and congregation founder (1845–1894)

Mother Mary Catherine De Ricci O. P.
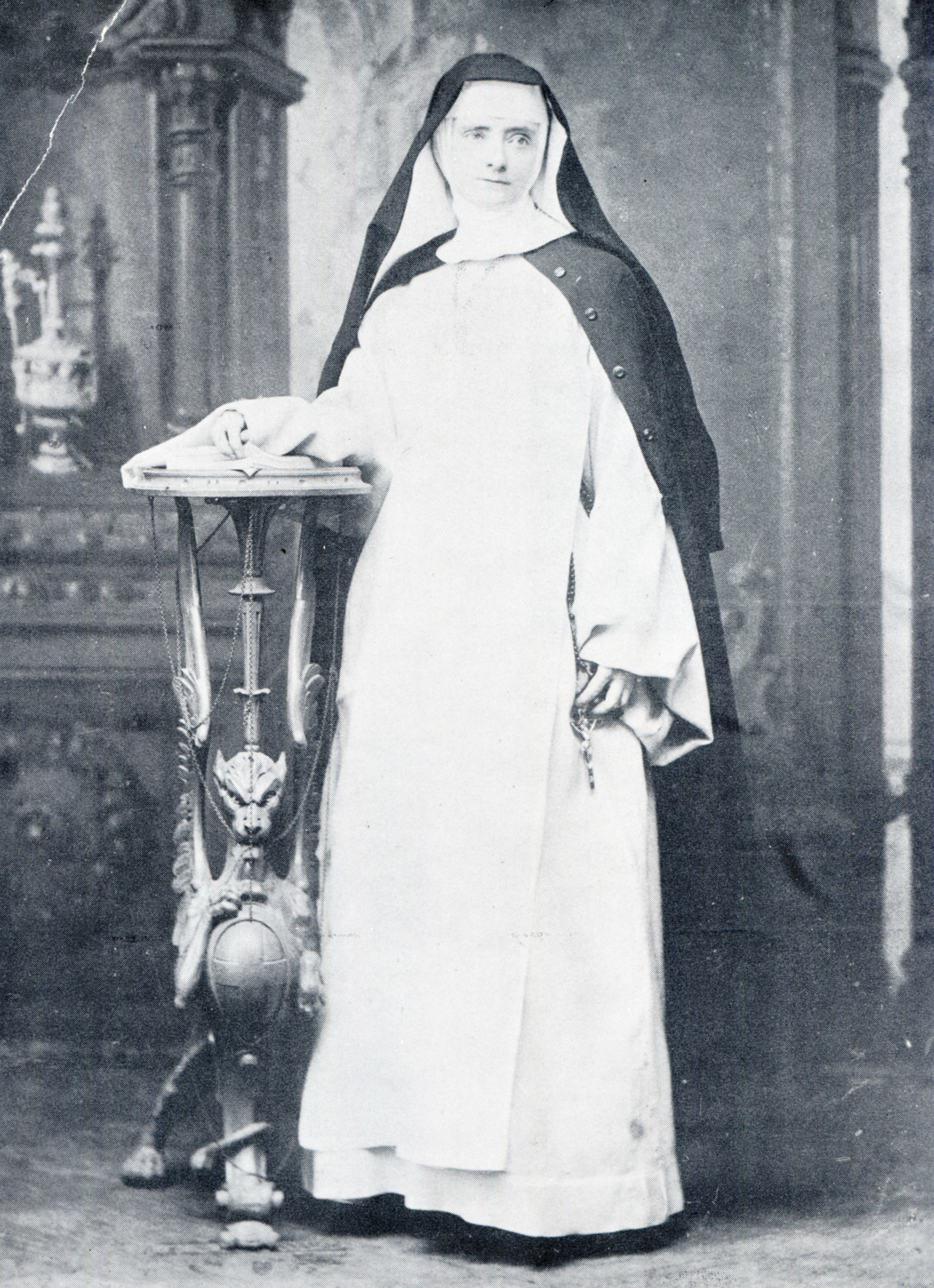
- De Ricci standing

Personal life
- Born: March 22, 1845 Brooklyn, New York
- Died: May 27, 1894 (aged 49)

Religious life
- Religion: Catholic

Lucy Eaton Smith, OP (1845–1894), known in religion as Mother Mary Catherine De Ricci of the Sacred Heart, was an American Catholic nun who founded the Dominican Sisters of St. Catherine de' Ricci, a pontifical institute in Albany, New York.

== Early life and education ==
She was born in Brooklyn to a nonreligious mother, Adelia O. McIntyre Smith, and a nominally Presbyterian father, Edwin Smith. Mr. Smith was a civil engineer, as were the men on his father's side, and his mother's relatives were bankers, so the family was affluent. Lucy Eaton Smith was educated privately at an Episcopal school, and made her debut to New York society. She was baptized Episcopalian at age 5, and remained Protestant until age 21.

As a young adult, Smith occasionally attended mass at St. Vincent De Paul Church, where she felt drawn. Accounts vary on what happened next in her path into the Catholic church. Some versions have her kneeling at the altar, and being asked why she remained Episcopalian. Others mention that years later most of her family also became Catholic. On December 18, 1865, she was received into the Catholic church by Father Alfred Young, a Paulist priest who also had entered the church from another denomination.

== Entrance into the Dominicans ==
Being a woman of means and also in variable health, she was encouraged to travel, perhaps to seek healing. She spent five years in Europe beginning in the early 1870s, visiting convents and exploring her faith. She was inspired by the Dominican saint and Italian mystic, Catherine de' Ricci, with whom she identified in illness, and because de' Ricci was a patron saint of the sick. Through the encouragement of Dominican Friar Pere Aquilani in Berlin, who had become her confessor, she expressed interest in becoming a member of the Sisters of the Cenacle. Instead, he encouraged her to the Dominicans, and legend says he showed her an orange tree and told her she would become its newest branch.

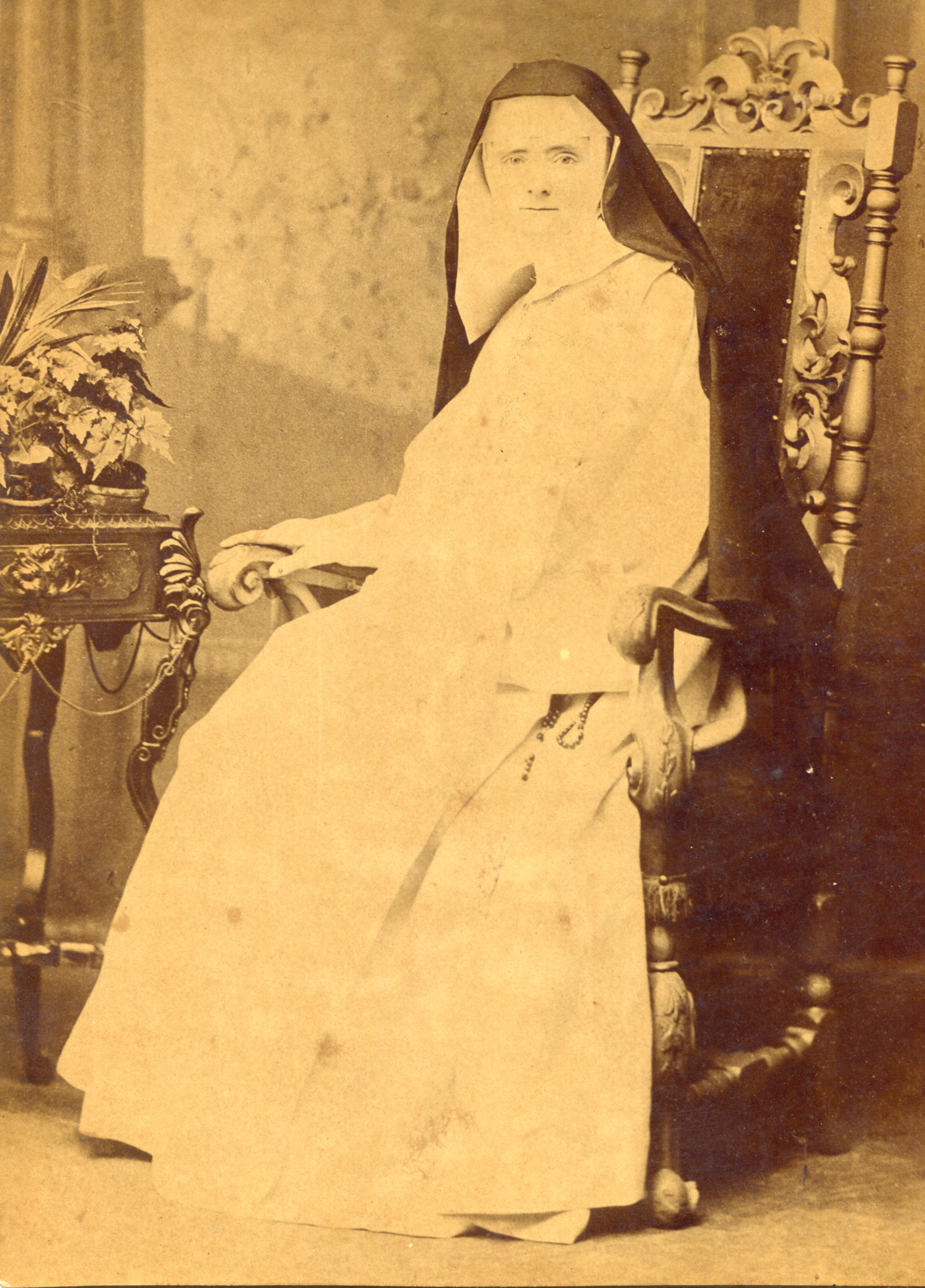
De Ricci sitting

Some sources say France and others say Rome, but she joined the Third Order of Saint Dominic as a lay Dominican. However, when she returned to New York in 1876, at Fr. Aquilan had urged, she was rebuffed or at least stalled by the Dominicans when there was no immediate financial or logistic interest in her desire to start a convent. Instead, she joined the Dominican Congregation of Our Lady of the Rosary, founded by two Englishwomen, Alice Mary and Lucy Thorpe, who had entered Catholicism from the Anglican Church. This was an active congregation that took care of orphans, however, and Smith was more visionary and contemplative. She left the sisters after nine months and lived with her maternal grandmother, Mrs. McIntyre, in Upstate New York, near Glen Falls. There she met a priest who introduced her to Francis McNeirny, Bishop of Albany, who approved her idea of founding a Dominican community in Glens Falls. She received her Dominican habit on May 24, 1880, and with her vows she took the name Mother Mary Catherine De Ricci of the Sacred Heart. She felt the third order rule would provide more freedom, along the lines of the patron saint of Italy, the third-order Dominican Saint Catherine of Siena.

Her sister Isabel "Lillie" Smith joined the convent as Mother M. Loyola of Jesus in 1886. The community moved to Albany in 1887. Mother De Ricci took her perpetual vows on March 25, 1890. She died on May 24, 1894.

Mother Loyola (Lillie) succeeded her as head of the congregation after her untimely death. She went to Havana, Cuba during the 1898 Spanish-American War at the invitation of Bishop Sbarretti, to care for Afro-Cuban children orphaned by the war. However, neither the Bishop nor the Cuban government would pay for the children's care, so the sisters begged for support, just as they had done to found their congregation. Saint Katharine Drexel, the wealthy Philadelphian who later founded the Sisters of the Blessed Sacrament, was one of their financial sponsors, and they opened a home in 1900.
