= John J. Conroy =

Irish-American clergyman (1819–1895)

His Excellency. The Right Reverend John Joseph Conroy
- Bishop of Albany; Titular Bishop of Curium
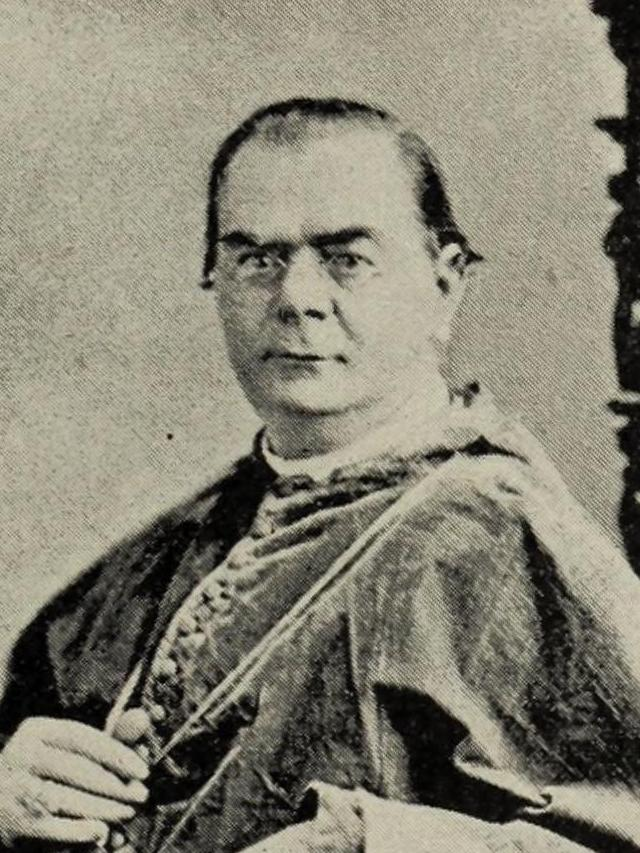
- In office: 1865-1877
- Predecessor: John McCloskey
- Successor: Francis McNeirny

Orders
- Ordination: May 21, 1842 by Bishop John Hughes
- Consecration: October 15, 1866 by Archbishop John McCloskey

Personal details
- Born: July 25, 1819 Clonaslee, Queen's County, Ireland
- Died: November 20, 1895 (aged 76) New York City, US
- Denomination: Roman Catholic
- Education: College of Montreal; Mount St. Mary's Seminary
- Motto: Salus ac spes (Health and hope)

John Joseph Conroy (July 25, 1819 – November 20, 1895) was an Irish-born clergyman of the Roman Catholic Church. He served as bishop of Albany in New York State from 1865 to 1877.

== Biography ==
=== Early life ===
John Conroy was born on July 25, 1819, in Clonaslee, Queen's County in Ireland. He emigrated to the United States at age 12. After studying under the Sulpicians at the College of Montreal in Montreal, Quebec, he studied theology at Mount St. Mary's Seminary in Emmitsburg, Maryland, and at St. John's College in New York City.

=== Priesthood ===
Conroy was ordained to the priesthood for the Diocese of New York by Bishop John Hughes on May 21, 1842 in New York City. After his ordination, Hughes appointed Conroy as vice-president of St. John's College in 1843, becoming president shortly afterward. In 1844, he was transferred to Albany, New York, the part of the archdiocese, to serve as pastor of St. Joseph's Parish. During his time at St. Joseph's, he established St. Vincent's Male Orphan Asylum in Albany, erected a convent for the Sisters of Charity, and rebuilt the parish church.

Pope Pius IX erected the Diocese of Albany in 1847, taking most of Eastern New York from the Diocese of New York. At that time, Conroy was incardinated, or transferred to the new diocese. In 1857 Bishop John McCloskey named Conroy as his vicar general.

=== Bishop of Albany ===
On July 7, 1865, Conroy was appointed the second bishop of Albany by Pope Pius IX. He received his episcopal consecration at the Cathedral of the Immaculate Conception in Albany, New York, on October 15, 1865, from McCloskey, with Bishops John Timon and John Loughlin serving as co-consecrators.

During his tenure as bishop, Conroy greatly increased the number of priests in the diocese, securing the services of the Augustinians and the Conventual Franciscans. Among the many institutions he founded were an industrial school, St. Agnes's Rural Cemetery in Menands, New York, St. Peter's Hospital in Albany, and a house for the Little Sisters of the Poor. On June 28, 1868, Conroy laid the cornerstone for a new hospital building for Troy Hospital in Troy, New York. He convened the second synod for the diocese, and attended the 1866 Plenary Council of Baltimore in Baltimore, Maryland, and the First Vatican Council in Rome in 1869.

=== Retirement and death ===
After twelve years as bishop of Albany, Conroy resigned due to ill health on October 16, 1877; the Vatican named him as titular bishop of Curium on the same date. Conroy moved back to New York City, where he died on November 20, 1895 at age 76. His funeral was held at the Cathedral of the Immaculate Conception, after which he was interred in the cathedral crypt.

Catholic Church titles
Preceded by John McCloskey	Bishop of Albany; 1865—1877	Succeeded by Francis McNeirny
