= Francis McNeirny =

American clergyman

His Excellency. The Right Reverend Francis McNeirny
- Bishop of Albany
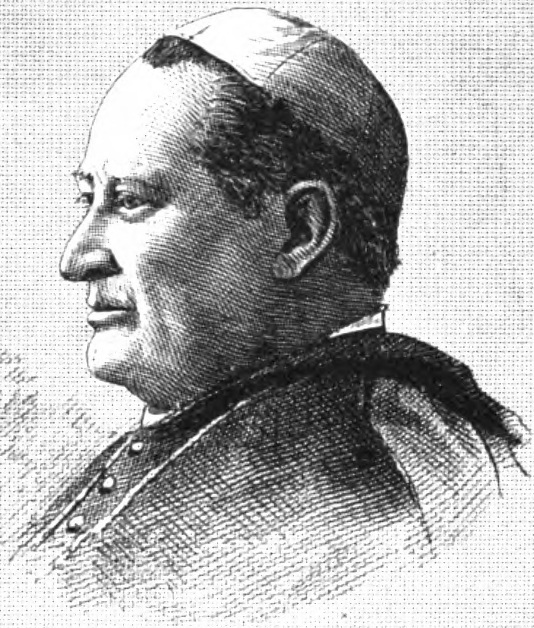
- In office: 1877 to 1894
- Predecessor: John J. Conroy
- Successor: Thomas Martin Aloysius Burke

Orders
- Ordination: May 21, 1842 by John Hughes
- Consecration: April 21, 1872 by John McCloskey

Personal details
- Born: April 25, 1828 New York City, US
- Died: January 2, 1894 (aged 65) Albany, New York, US
- Denomination: Roman Catholic
- Education: College of Montreal; Grand Seminary of Montreal
- Motto: Quod vult Deus (What God wills)

Francis McNeirny (April 25, 1828 – January 2, 1894) was an American prelate of the Roman Catholic Church who served as bishop of Albany in New York State from 1877 until his death in 1894.

== Biography ==
=== Early life ===
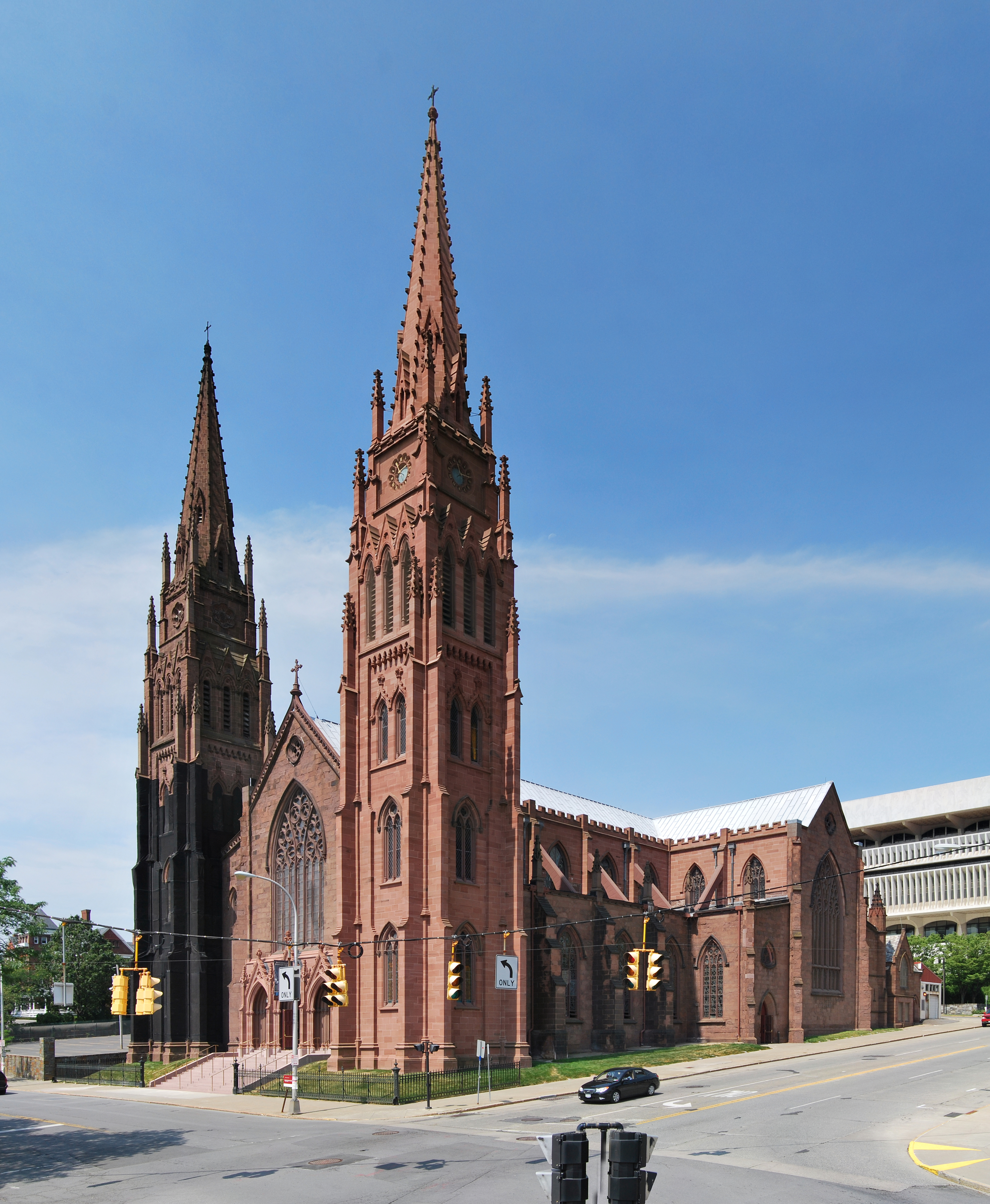
Cathedral of the Immaculate Conception, Albany, New York (2011)

Francis McNeirny was born on April 25, 1828, in New York City to Patrick and Margaret (née Sheridan) McNeirny, natives of County Cavan. He received his early education at a private school in the city. Deciding to become a priest, he entered the College of Montrealin Montreal, Quebec, in 1841. He graduated with distinction in 1849, and then made his theological studies at the Grand Seminary of Montreal. While still a scholastic, he served as procurator of the Grand Seminary for a year and then as professor of belles-lettres at the College of Montreal for two years.

=== Priesthood ===
McNeirny was ordained to the priesthood in New York City for the Diocese of New York by Bishop John Hughes on May 21, 1842. After his ordination, the diocese assigned him as a curate at Old St. Patrick's Cathedral Parish in Manhattan. Hughes later named him as his private secretary and master of ceremonies. The Vatican in 1850 elevated the Diocese of New York to the Archdiocese of New York. Hughes, now archbishop, named McNeirny as chancellor of the archdiocese in 1857. He also served as pastor of St. Mary's Parish in Rondout, New York.

=== Coadjutor Bishop and Bishop of Albany ===
On December 22, 1871, McNeirny was appointed coadjutor bishop of Albany and titular bishop of Rhesaina by Pope Pius IX to assist Bishop John J. Conroy. He received his episcopal consecration on April 21, 1872, from Archbishop John McCloskey, with Bishops John Loughlin and David William Bacon serving as co-consecrators, in Old St. Patrick's Cathedral. As Conroy's health had declined, McNeirny took charge of the diocese in 1874. After Conroy retired, McNeirny automatically succeeded him as bishop of Albany on October 16, 1877.

Although Albany lost territory with the erection of the Diocese of Ogdensburg in 1872, McNeirny greatly increased the number of priests, churches, and parochial schools. He also secured the services of the Dominican Tertiaries, Sisters of the Good Shepherd, and Redemptorist Fathers for the diocese. One of his greatest achievements was the enlargement and completion of the Cathedral of the Immaculate Conception by the addition of an apse and the erection of new sacristies and a tower. In 1880 he approved Lucy Eaton Smith to found her diocesan community, the Dominican Sisters of St. Catherine de' Ricci.

=== Death ===
McNeirny died from pneumonia on January 2, 1894, at his residence in Albany, aged 65.

Catholic Church titles
Preceded by John J. Conroy	Bishop of Albany; 1877—1894	Succeeded by Thomas Martin Aloysius Burke
