= Thomas Martin Aloysius Burke =

Irish-born clergyman

His Excellency. The Right Reverend Thomas Martin Aloysius Burke
- Bishop of Albany
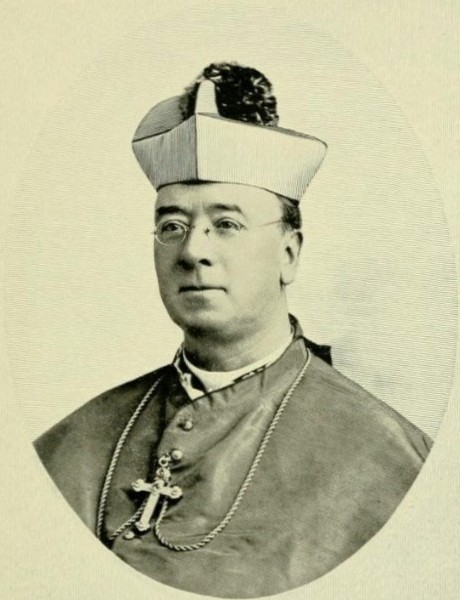
- In office: 1894 to 1915.
- Predecessor: Francis McNeirny
- Successor: Thomas Cusack

Orders
- Ordination: June 30, 1864 by Francis Patrick McFarland.
- Consecration: July 1, 1894 by Michael Corrigan

Personal details
- Born: January 10, 1840 Swinford, County Mayo, Ireland
- Died: January 20, 1915 (aged 75) Albany, New York, US
- Denomination: Roman Catholic
- Education: St. Michael's College; St. Charles College in Ellicott City; St. Mary's Seminary
- Motto: Deus spes mea (God is my hope)

Thomas Martin Aloysius Burke KGCHS (January 10, 1840 – January 20, 1915) was an Irish-born clergyman of the Catholic Church. He served as bishop of Albany in New York State from 1894 until his death in 1915.

== Biography ==
=== Early life ===
Thomas Burke was born on January 10, 1840, in Swinford, County Mayo, the son of Dr. Ulrich Burke. His father moved the family to Utica, New York, in 1850. Thomas Burke received his early education from the Christian Brothers in Utica; he then attended St. Michael's College in Toronto, Ontario. In 1856, he entered St. Charles College in Ellicott City, Maryland, where he befriended his classmate James Gibbons. Burke completed his theological studies at St. Mary's Seminary in Baltimore, Maryland.

=== Priesthood ===
Burke was ordained to the priesthood for the Diocese of Albany in Baltimore, on June 30, 1864 by Bishop Francis Patrick McFarland. After his ordination, the diocese assigned Burke as a curate at St. John's Parish in Albany, New York. In 1865, he was named pastor of St. Joseph's Parish in the same city. Thomas Martin Aloysius Burke was on the Bishop's Council from 1885-1887. Bishop Francis McNierney appointed Burke as his vicar general in 1887. Thomas Martin Aloysius Burke was a Diocesan Consultor from 1887-1894. Thomas Martin Aloysius Burke was on the Diocesan Board of Examination from 1887-1893. Pope Leo XIII named Burke as a Knight of the Holy Sepulchre in 1890.

=== Bishop of Albany ===
On May 15, 1894, Burke was appointed the fourth bishop of Albany by Leo XIII. He received his episcopal consecration on July 1, 1894, from Archbishop Michael Corrigan, with Bishops Bernard John McQuaid and Patrick Anthony Ludden serving as co-consecrators, in the Cathedral of the Immaculate Conception in Albany. During his administration, he enlarged the Boys' Asylum in Albany, reduced the large diocesan debt, and renovated the Cathedral of the Immaculate Conception. Burke established cordial relations with Protestant clergy throughout the diocese.

=== Death ===
Burke died on January 20, 1915 in Albany at age 75.

Catholic Church titles
Preceded by Francis McNierney	Bishop of Albany; 1894—1915	Succeeded by Thomas Cusack
