= Cathedral of the Immaculate Conception (Albany, New York) =

Historic church in New York, United States

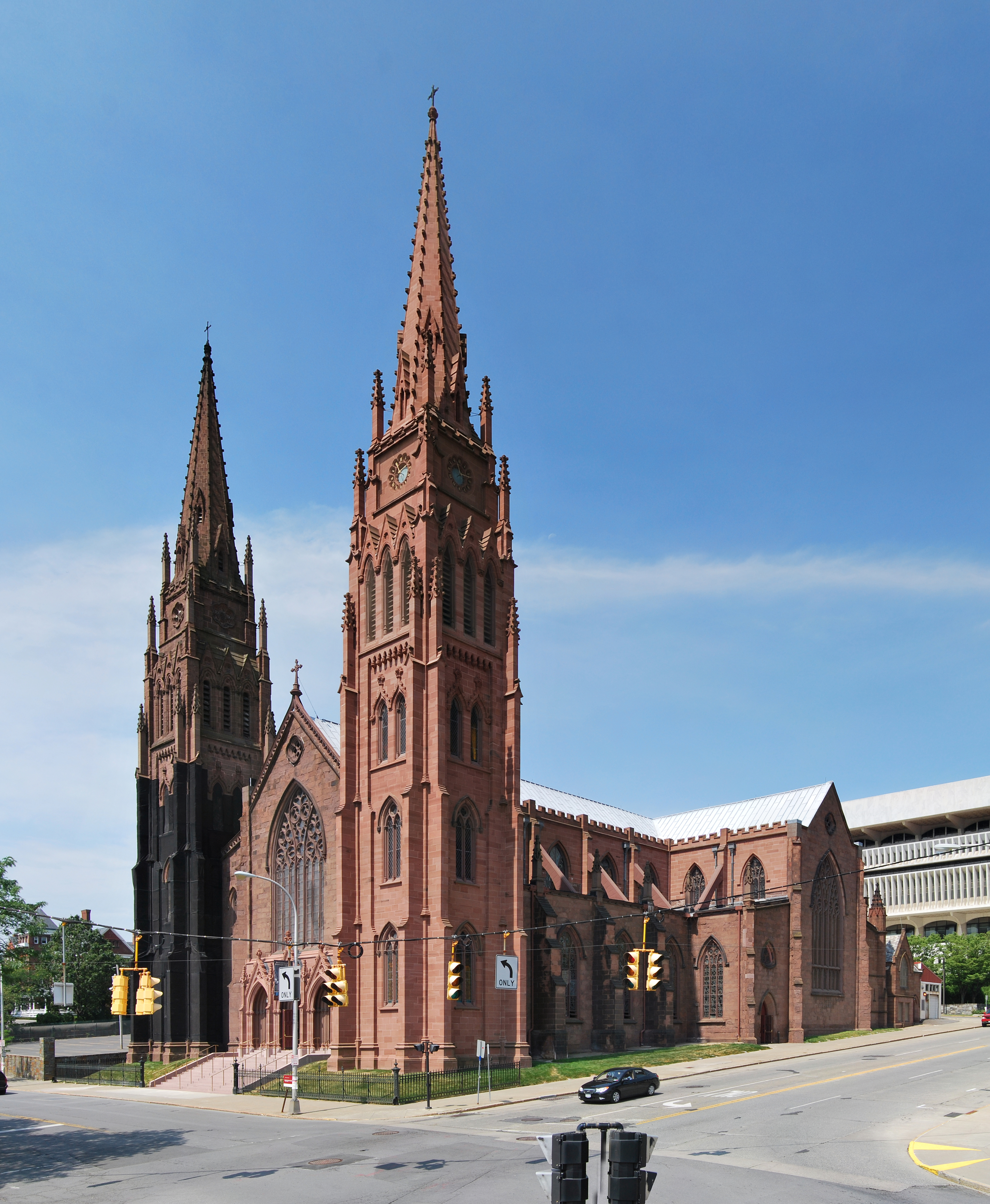
- East elevation and north profile, 2011

- Location within New York
- 42°38′51″N 73°45′35″W
- Location: 125 Eagle St. Albany, New York
- Country: United States
- Denomination: Catholic Church
- Website: www.cathedralic.com

History
- Founded: 1847
- Consecrated: 1902

Architecture
- Heritage designation: NRHP #76001203
- Designated: June 8, 1976
- Architect: Patrick Keely
- Style: Gothic Revival
- Groundbreaking: 1848
- Completed: 1852
- Construction cost: $250,000

Specifications
- Capacity: 2,500
- Length: 195 feet (59 m)
- Width: 95 feet (29 m)
- Materials: brick, sandstone, plaster

Administration
- Diocese: Diocese of Albany

Clergy
- Bishop: Most Rev. Mark O’Connell
- Rector: Very Rev. Jay J. Atherton

The Cathedral of the Immaculate Conception is a Catholic church near the Mansion District in Albany, New York in the United States. Built in the period of the 1848–1852, it is the mother church of the Diocese of Albany. In 1976 it was listed on the National Register of Historic Places.

Designed by Irish American architect Patrick Keely to accommodate Albany's growing population of Catholic immigrants, Immaculate Conceptions is the second-oldest cathedral in the state, after St. Patrick's Cathedral in New York City. It is also the third oldest Catholic cathedral in the United States, and the first American Catholic cathedral in the Neo-Gothic architectural style.

The cathedral interior features the original stained glass windows, imported from England, and award-winning Stations of the Cross statuary. When completed, Immaculate Conception was the tallest building in Albany. It has hosted visits by cardinals and leaders of other faiths, including an archbishop of Canterbury, and the weddings of two Catholic governors' daughters. In 1986, Immaculate Conception hosted the first-ever service of forgiveness between Catholics and Jews on Palm Sunday, an event commemorated by a sculpture outside the building.

The construction of Immaculate Conception took four years. The south tower was not consecrated until 1902. The construction of Empire State Plaza,threatened the cathedral in the 1960s when it required the demolition of most of the surrounding neighborhood. Immaculate Conception has been through several renovations in its history, including a $30 million restoration in the early 21st century.

== Location ==
Immaculate Conception Cathedral is located in a one-acre (4,000 m^{2}) lot on the southwest corner of Eagle Street and Madison Avenue (U.S. Route 20). The terrain slopes gently westward from the Hudson River roughly three-quarters of a mile (1.1 km) to the east. The cathedral is located just outside the Mansion Historic District Bleecker Park; beyond it are rowhouses that contribute to that district.The cathedral neighborhood consists of large state-government buildings.

- To its south, a parking lot separates the cathedral and the governor's mansion. The remaining nearby buildings reflect a more modernist late 20th-century style.
- On the west, past a plaza with a small fountain, is the large building that houses the New York State Museum, library and archives.
- The Erastus Corning Tower, the centerpiece of Empire State Plaza, rises to the north behind a high retaining wall.
- East of the cathedral is a parking garage.

=== Cathedral exterior ===
==== Construction. ====
An iron railing along both sidewalks sets off the church building. The brick walls are faced in sandstone. Slate shingles cover the gabled rolled lead roof.Four more buttresses rise two stories to the roof along the sides of the nave, setting apart Gothic tracery windows. These buttresses are topped with crocketed pinnacles at the castellated roofline. The circular chancel offsets the rectilinearity of the rest of the church.

==== Facades ====
The East (front) facade has three portals with crocketed gables, divided by four miniature buttresses with crocketed pinnacles. Two larger buttresses, similarly treated, rise to roof level on either side. A large Gothic tracery window is above them, topped by a small recessed quatrefoil window in the gable apex. A pierced tracery parapet is mounted at the roofline. Small arched tracery windows appear in the facade's flanks.

==== Bell towers ====
Two 210-foot (64 m) bell towers flank the main entrance of the cathedral. At their base, the north and south towers are supported by double-angled buttresses on their corners. The bell towers are topped with crocketed pinnacles three stories above.

- The first two stories of the bell towers have paired windows, topped by a small quatrefoil under a pointed dripstone.
- At the third story, this pattern changes to double windows under cusped arches, topped by a crocketed ogee arch, above which is a line of plain corbels.
- The fourth story windows, surrounding the belfry, consist of three narrow louvered arches with a cusped dripstone and gable.

On the north tower, the top half-story is faced on all sides with a clock. A sexfoil window occupies the same position on the south tower. Each tower is topped by a spire, rising from a castellated base. The towers are pierced by small narrow gabled dormers just above the base. Rows of vertical crocketing decorate the section lines.

=== Cathedral interior ===
Immaculate Conception Cathedral is shaped like a Latin cross, with two side aisles, a clerestory and a circular chancel at the west (rear) end. The transept is two bays long.

==== Vestibule ====
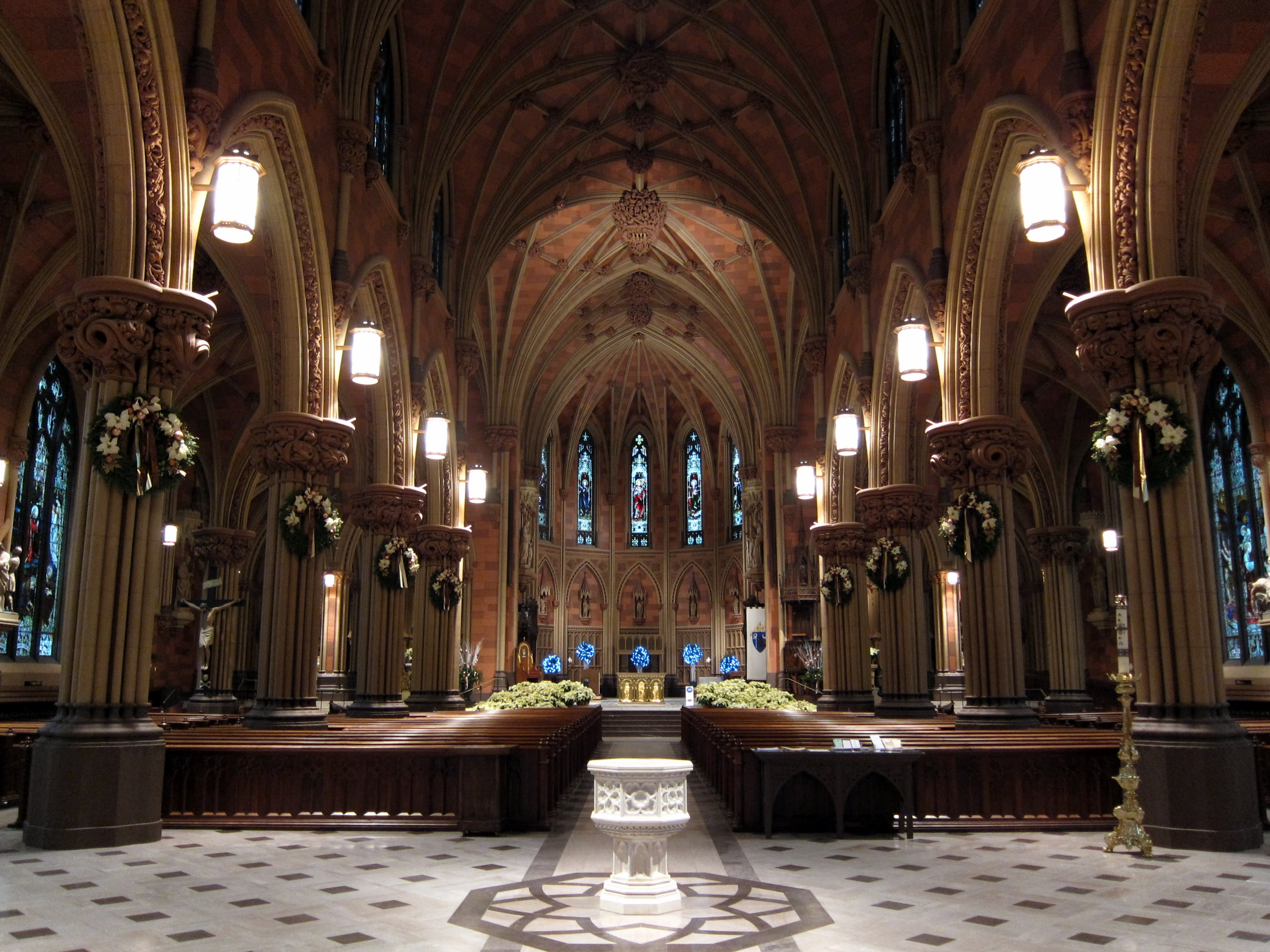
Interior with Christmas decorations, Immaculate Conception Cathedral (2012)

The main doors of the cathedral open into a full-width vestibule with a flat-beamed ceiling. From the vestibule, doorways lead to the two bell towers and the three aisles of the sanctuary. A baptismal font of white Caen stone sits at the front of the vestibule.

==== Ceiling ====
The vaulted cathedral ceiling is supported by clustered engaged columns with heavy capitals. The columns are decorated with organic motifs that include carvings of grapes and grape leaves, a particularly Romanesque touch. Heavy bosses connect the ceiling vaults and light fixtures are attached to the walls between the arches.

==== Nave ====
The cathedral nave is five bays long. It has vaults dividing its four sections, with secondary ribs and extensive bossing. Walnut pews sit on a marble patterned floor. The Stations of the Cross are small sculptures lining the perimeter of the nave. Between the stations are the stained glass windows, original to the building.The stained glass windows in the nave were manufactured in Birmingham, England.

==== Chancel ====
The chancel sits in the rear of the nave and is divided into seven sections.Each section is separated by a single column with a small capital. Each column has a recessed arched panel holding a statue of a saint. The chancel walls have lancet windows with stained glass. The bishop's cathedra is located on the south side of the chancel.The main altar sits on a raised concrete platform in the chancel. The west wall of the chancel contains the Lady window, a 14th-century style stained glass work depicting the life of the Virgin Mary. It was designed by H.W. Ackroyd of Sheffield, England and built by William Wailes of Newcastle-upon-Tyne, England.

== History ==
Immaculate Conception Cathedral was built as much for social reasons as the practical needs of the church in an area where its presence had previously been minimal. It took the latter half of the 19th century to complete, and was only consecrated on its 50th anniversary. The building suffered from deferred maintenance during the middle of the 20th century, requiring an extensive renovation in the early 21st century.

=== 1796 – 1847: Catholicism comes to Albany ===
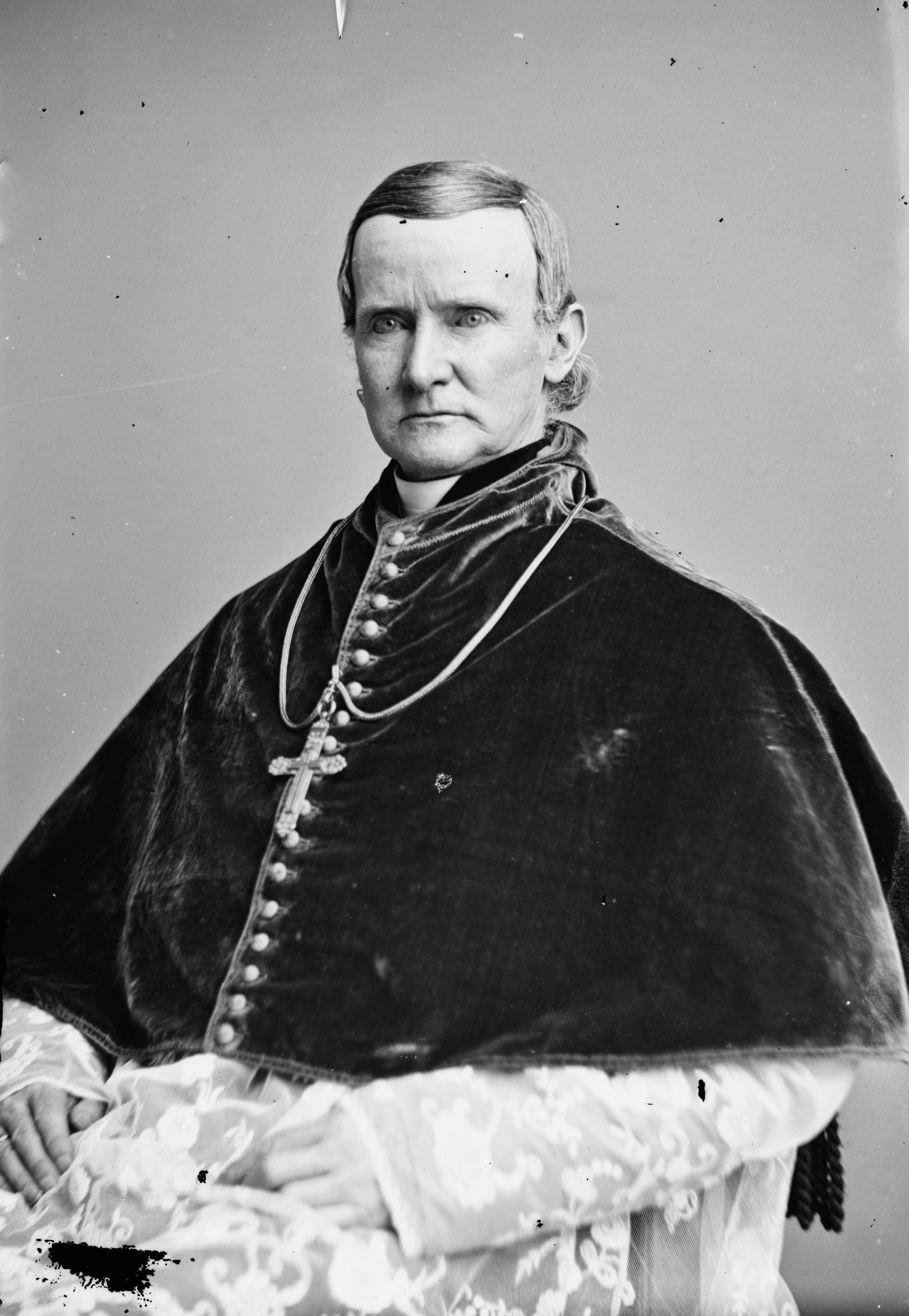
Bishop McCloskey (ca. 1855-1865)

By the end of the American Revolution in 1781, the tiny Catholic population in the new State of New York was concentrated in New York City. It was served by St. Peter's Parish, erected in 1786 as the only parish in the state. When Pope Pius VI erected the Diocese of Baltimore in 1789, the entire United States was put under its jurisdiction.St. Mary's Parish, erected in downtown Albany in 1796, became the second parish in the state and the only one in Upstate New York.

In 1808, the Vatican erected the Diocese of New York, covering all of New York State and part of New Jersey. Nine years later, in 1817 Irish immigrants began migrating to Albany to build the Erie Canal across the state. Businesses established themselves at the eastern terminus of the canal in Albany attracting even more immigrants to the region. Catholic immigrants began settling in Albany, the Capital District and the Mohawk Valley. These Catholics established new parishes in their communities.

Immigration from Ireland to the United States surged during the 1840s, due to the extreme privations of the Great Famine in that country. By 1847, the Catholic Church was well established and growing in Albany and other cities in the region. At the request of the Catholic hierarchy, Pope Pius IX erected the Diocese of Albany. John McCloskey, later archbishop of New York, was installed as the first bishop of Albany in 1847, with St. Mary's designated as his pro-cathedral.

Like other churches in the new diocese, St. Mary's was operated by a board of trustees who exercised a great deal of autonomy due to Albany's distance from the bishop in New York City. When McCloskey became bishop, he clashed with the board over its poor financial management, which had left the parish deep;y in debt. "What should belong to the present and the future is already mortgaged to the past!" complained McCloskey's superior, John Hughes, archbishop of New York. Before he had taken up his position in Albany, McCloskey had warned that "sooner or later, the trustee system as it exists will destroy or be destroyed by the Catholic religion."

=== 1848 – 1852: Construction of cathedral ===
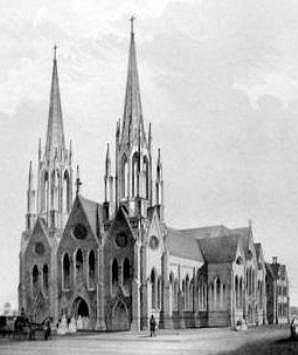
Calvary Church, Manhattan (between 1848 and 1867)

As the new bishop of Albany, McCloskey needed a new cathedral; St. Mary's was too small to serve that need. In addition, he wanted a more impressive building that would assert the place of Irish Catholic immigrants in the diocese. During the 1840s, Irish and German Catholic immigrants across the country had been subjected to a nativist backlash by many Protestants, championed by the Know-Nothing Party. Nativist riots in other American cities had seen the killing of Catholics and the destruction of Catholic churches and other property.

At his first retreat with the priests of the diocese, McCloskey persuaded them to pledge over $5,000 to start the building fund for the new cathedral. He commissioned the architect Patrick Keely, an Irish immigrant himself, to design the cathedral. Keely was not a design pioneer, but he followed his era's architectural trends closely. He was closely influenced by the ideas of British architect Augustus Pugin, as epitomized in Pugin's book True Principles. Kelley also admired St George the Martyr Southwark, an Anglican church in London designed by Pugin in 1841.

While Keely was living in Brooklyn, two new Episcopal churches were built in Manhattan employing the Gothic Revival style; Trinity Church, designed by Richard Upjohn, and Grace Church, designed by James Renwick. Renwick had also built Calvary Church in Manhattan. For the cathedral in Albany, Keely may have been influenced by the walls of Grace and Trinity Churches and the twin-bell tower facade of Calvary Church.

In 1848, McCloskey and Hughes laid the cornerstone for Immaculate Conception Cathedral. While the cathedral was being built, McCloskey traveled within the United States and to Europe raise funds for the project. He solicited donations from the Leopoldine Society in Austria-Hungary and the Society for the Propagation of the Faith in France. To save time and money on the cathedral construction, McCloskey decided to use plaster and lath painted to look like stone on the interior dome. Most of the construction workers were immigrants; many of them volunteered their labor to the project. The final construction cost for the project was $250,000 ($9.68 million in modern dollars). Hughes and McCloskey dedicated Immaculate Conception Cathedral in 1852.

In 1848, McCloskey and Hughes laid the cornerstone for Immaculate Conception Cathedral. While the cathedral was being built, McCloskey traveled within the United States and to Europe raise funds for the project. He solicited donations from the Leopoldine Society in Austria-Hungary and the Society for the Propagation of the Faith in France. To save time and money on the cathedral construction, McCloskey decided to use plaster and lath painted to look like stone on the interior dome. Most of the construction workers were immigrants; many of them volunteered their labor to the project. The final construction cost for the project was $250,000 ($9.68 million in modern dollars). Hughes and McCloskey dedicated Immaculate Conception Cathedral in 1852. The chancel and spires remained to be constructed.

=== 1853 – 1902: Completion and consecration ===
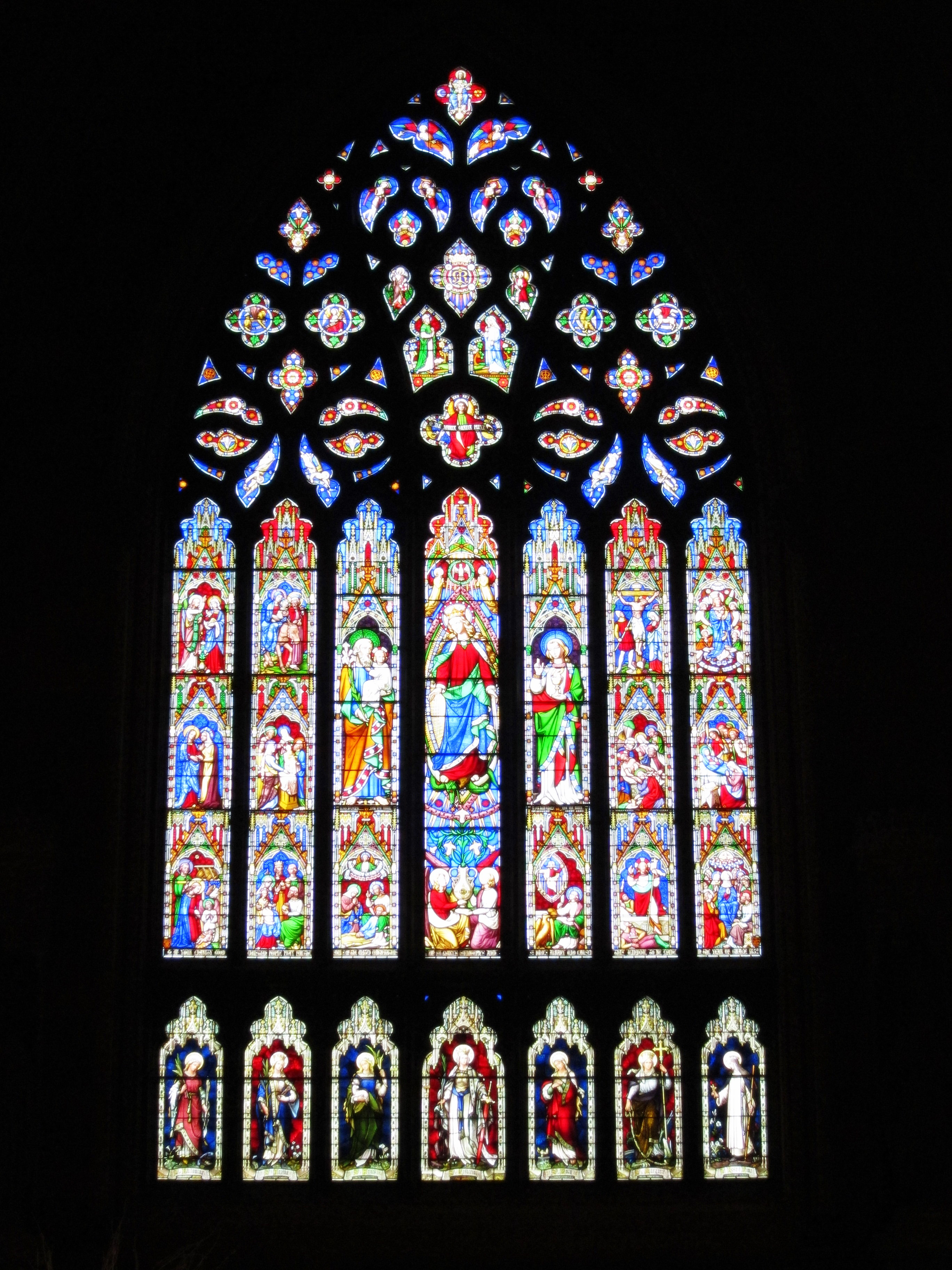
Lady Window, Immaculate Conception Cathedral (2012)

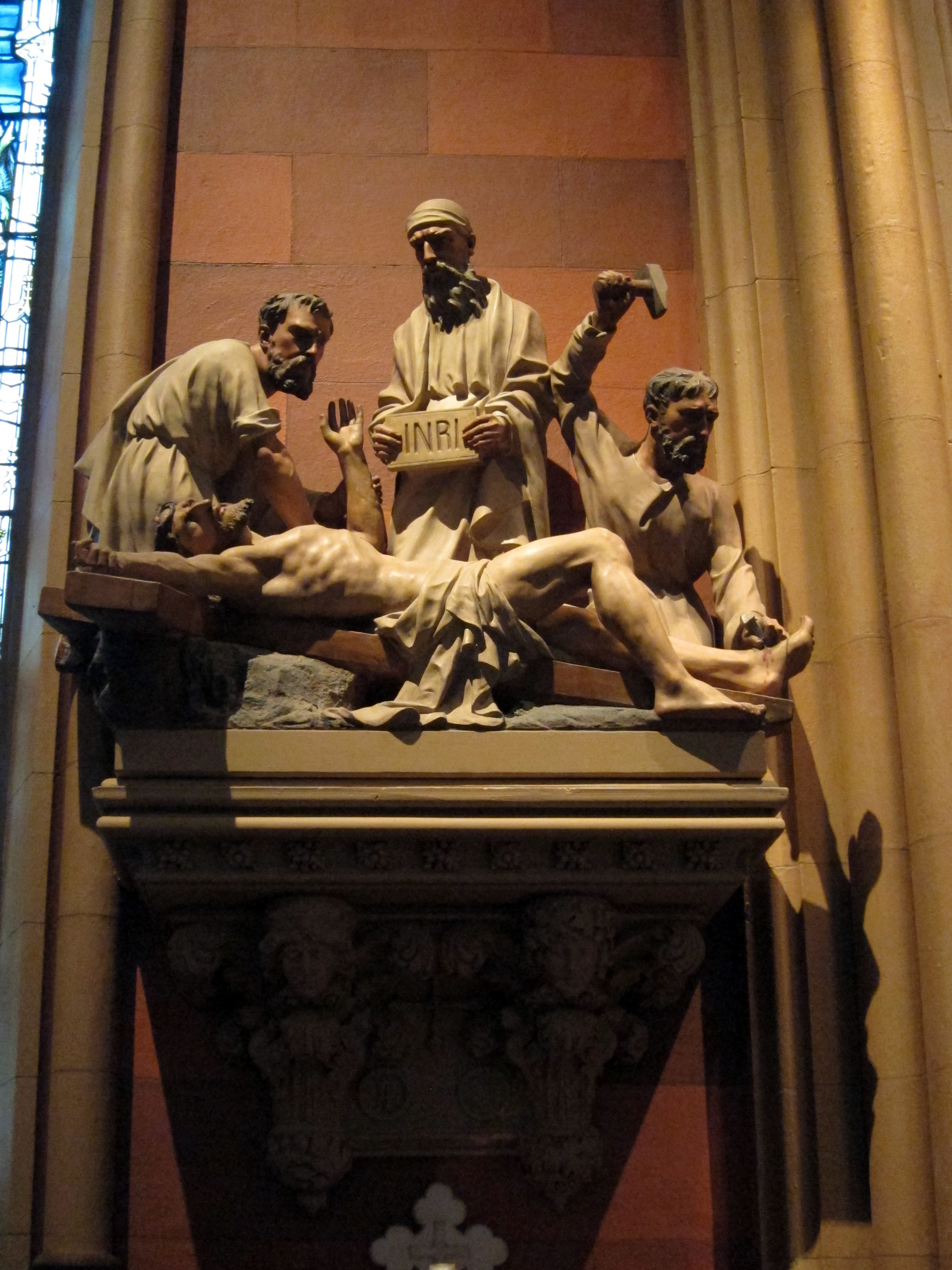
Station of the Cross XI, Immaculate Conception Cathedral (2012)

In 1858, the diocese added a spire to Immaculate Conception. The north tower was completed in 1862. Its 210-foot (64 m) height made it the city's tallest building for many years. The bells were cast at the Meneely Bell Foundry in West Troy (today Watervliet); they were rung for the first time on December 8, 1862.In 1868, the diocese added the iron fencing around the cathedral.

Fueled by waves of Germans and Italian immigrants, Albany's Catholic population continued to grow in the late 19th century. A restoration was necessary in 1882.The diocese added the south tower's spire in 1888; in 1892, the apse and sacristies were added, completing Keeley's original design. The interior was also renewed, with the gradual addition of most of the stained glass windows, including the one in the south transept depicting the Last Judgment in 1897. Like many of the interior finishes added during this period, they were European in origin. The choir stalls were carved in Belgium in 1894, and the high pulpit was carved of Dutch oak.

In 1900, the original painted Stations of the Cross were replaced with Beaux-Arts sculptures; these sculptures had won an award at the Paris Exposition of 1889. Two years later, on the 50th anniversary of the cathedral's opening, it was formally consecrated by Bishop Thomas Burke. The same year, the exterior was refaced.

=== 1903 – 2008: Deferred maintenance ===
With the cathedral complete, it played its intended role in the city and the church for the first half of the 20th century. Priests were ordained and bishops consecrated there. Visitors included many cardinals, and leaders from other faiths, such as Michael Ramsey, Archbishop of Canterbury and thus leader of the Church of England. During the 1920s, New York Governor Al Smith, the first Catholic to hold that position, became a regular parishioner at Immaculate Conception. Smith's daughter Catherine was married at the cathedral in 1928.In 1936, the diocese replaced the buttresses on the north and south aisles with stronger ones. The cathedral essentially remained untouched for the next 30 years.

During the 1960s, the state government demolished most of the neighborhoods north and west of Immaculate Conception to build the Empire State Plaza. With only 300 houses remaining in the cathedral parish, its congregation was greatly diminished. There were fears that the cathedral could not survive as functioning institution. , and with the resulting diminution of the congregation it was uncertain that the cathedral could survive as an institution. Bishop William Scully, with assistance from New York Governor Nelson Rockefeller, were able to avert the crisis.

When Auxiliary Bishop Edwin Broderick was installed as bishop of Albany in 1970, he realized that Immaculate Conception was long overdue for a renovation. However, the cost of all the needed repairs exceed his financial resources. Broderick was only able to add new crockets on the towers and replace the buttresses for the clerestory.

Howard Hubbard in 1977 was appointed bishop of Albany. In 1986, he held the first-ever Palm Sunday service of reconciliation between Christians and Jews at Immaculate Conception. The service drew 1,500 guests, both Christian and Jewish. During the service, Hubbard "expressed contrition and remorse for the centuries of anti-Jewish hostility promulgated under the Church's auspices". To commemorate the event, the sculpture Portal, created by Robert Blood, was installed outside the cathedral.In 1993, Madeline Cuomo, the daughter of New York Governor Mario Cuomo, was married in the cathedral.

=== 2009 – present: Restoration ===
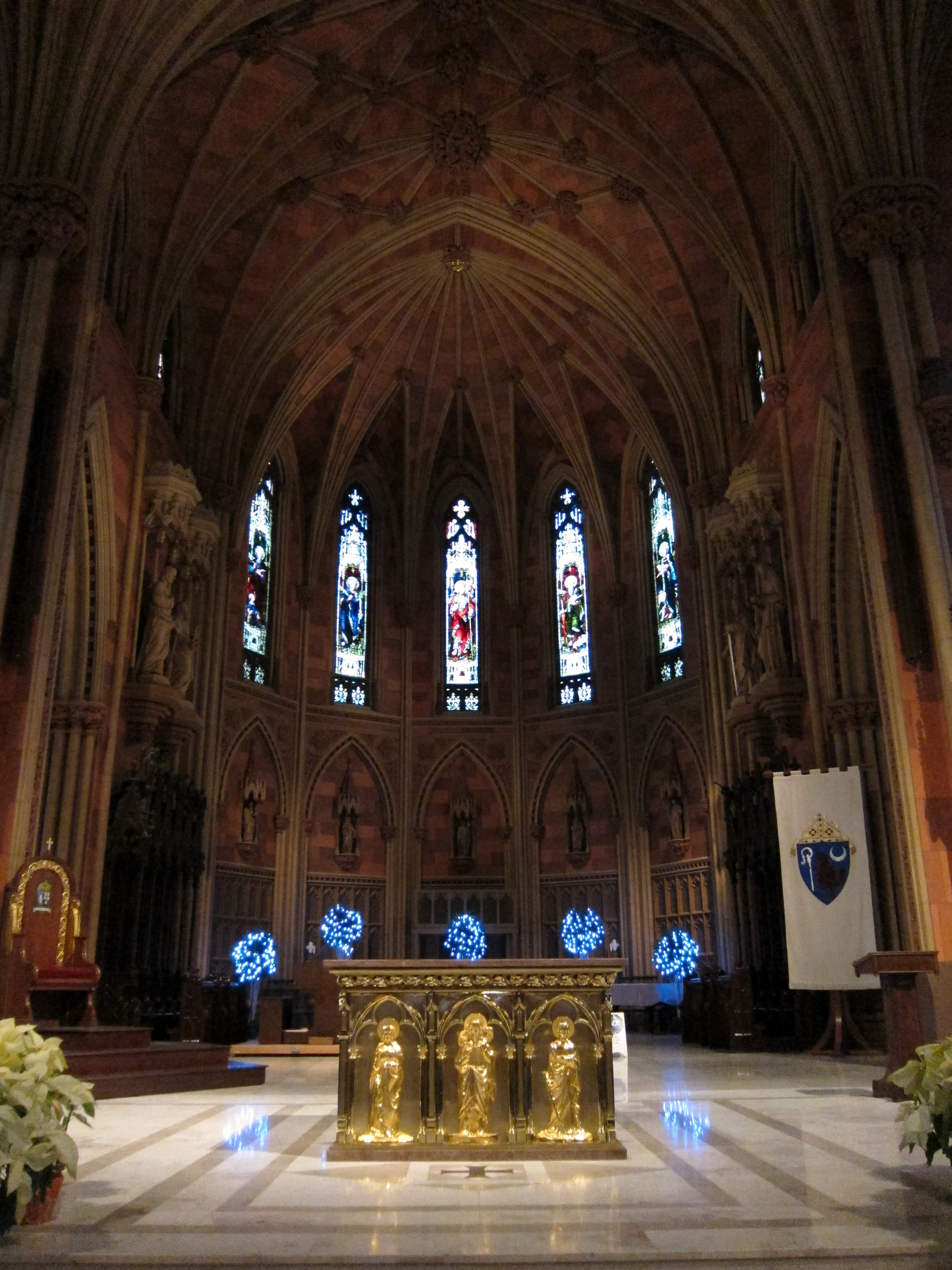
Chancel, apse, and relocated altar, Immaculate Conception Cathedral (2012)

By the 2000s, the cathedral roof was leaking; during the winter, a 62-foot (19 m) icicle would form on one interior wall, almost reaching the floor. A large chunk of plaster fell off the ceiling on one occasion, nearly striking a visiting bishop. Hubbard realized that the diocese could no longer postpone a thorough restoration of the building.

Hubbard succeed in raising $6 million to start the project and closed Immaculate Conception. On the inside, Contractors replaced rotten structural lumber and rewired the building. They replastered the ceiling and repainted the walls, trying to replicate their original colors. The diocese moved the altar to a raised concrete platform closer to the pews and relocated the baptismal font to the rear of the church. To add to parishioner comfort, the pews were widened and their backs reclined.

On the outside of the cathedral, contractors replaced the deteriorated sandstone on the north tower and clerestory with new sandstone from England. They installed granite steps and new sandstone portals to the main entrance. During the renovation, contractors replaced the spire on the north tower after discovering that it was leaning 13 inches (330 mm) over the street. A new cross was mounted on the spire. A rolled lead roof was also installed on the cathedral. The total project cost came to $19 million

Immaculate Conception Cathedral was rededicated in 2010 on its 158th anniversary. One thousand people attended the mass celebrated by Hubbard, along with Cardinals Timothy Dolan and Edward Egan. Hubbard called the cathedral's presence among the many state government buildings nearby a reminder of the presence of God in human affairs and said it was for the whole community, not just Albany's Catholics. He called particular attention to the restored original colors, recalling how he had been disappointed with the building's gloomy interior on his first visit to it as a boy.

The cathedral was closed in 2018 for a year to update the electrical wiring, install a new lighting system and replaster and paint necessary areas. The diocese also installed a new fire detection system.

== Music ==
During the 19th century, Immaculate Conception Cathedral maintained a resident orchestra and 75-member choir. Classical music was routinely played at services. As of 2026, the cathedral supports the Cathedral Choir, composed of adults and older teenagers.The cathedral has hosted performances by the Albany Symphony Orchestra and the Empire State Youth Orchestra, along with visiting artists such as the Boston Brass and the Irish tenor Anthony Kearns.

=== Pipe Organ ===
When Immaculate Conception opened in 1852, it had a three-manual pipe organ designed by Henry Erben. It was 52 feet (16 m) high, 20 feet (6.1 m) deep and 30 feet (9.1 m) wide. The pipe organ had 42 stops and 3,000 pipes. It cost $8,000 ($310,000 in modern dollars). In 1880, the diocese installed overhanging keys, additional notes and mechanical stop control on the instrument.

In 1947, the Erben organ was incorporated into a new pipe organ built by M.P. Moller in Hagerstown, Maryland. Several ranks of the original pipes were included while the original casework was replaced. A trumpet en chamade was added in 1969.

By the late 1970s, vibration damage from the construction of the Empire State Plaza had left the Moller pipe organ unusable. The diocese replaced the pipe organ with an electronic organ When the church was renovated in the first decade of the 21st century, the electronic organ was removed and replaced by a smaller instrument.The pipes of the Moller pipe organ were removed from the choir loft and placed into storage. The pipe organ was rebuilt during the 2010s.

=== Bells ===
By the mid-1970s, all of the ten Meneely bells in the bell towers were inoperable. Their wooden supports, poorly built and incomplete, needed replacement. As part of the restoration, one volunteer, Joe Connors, looked into restoring them.

A system had been installed to allow the bells to be rung electronically, but Connors discovered that mistakes had been made on both the hardware and the software that operated it. As a result, the Westminster Quarters tones that rang every 15 minutes sounded off-key. According to Savoy, they had been programmed to play notes that the bells themselves didn't have.

Correcting the software errors, allowed the system to play the quarters correctly, but Connors deactivated any other hymns until the cathedral could purchase new software. In the meantime, he offered to restore the pulleys and belts that were broken, allowing the bells to be played manually. By early 2012, Connors had restored seven of the bells.

Cathedral images

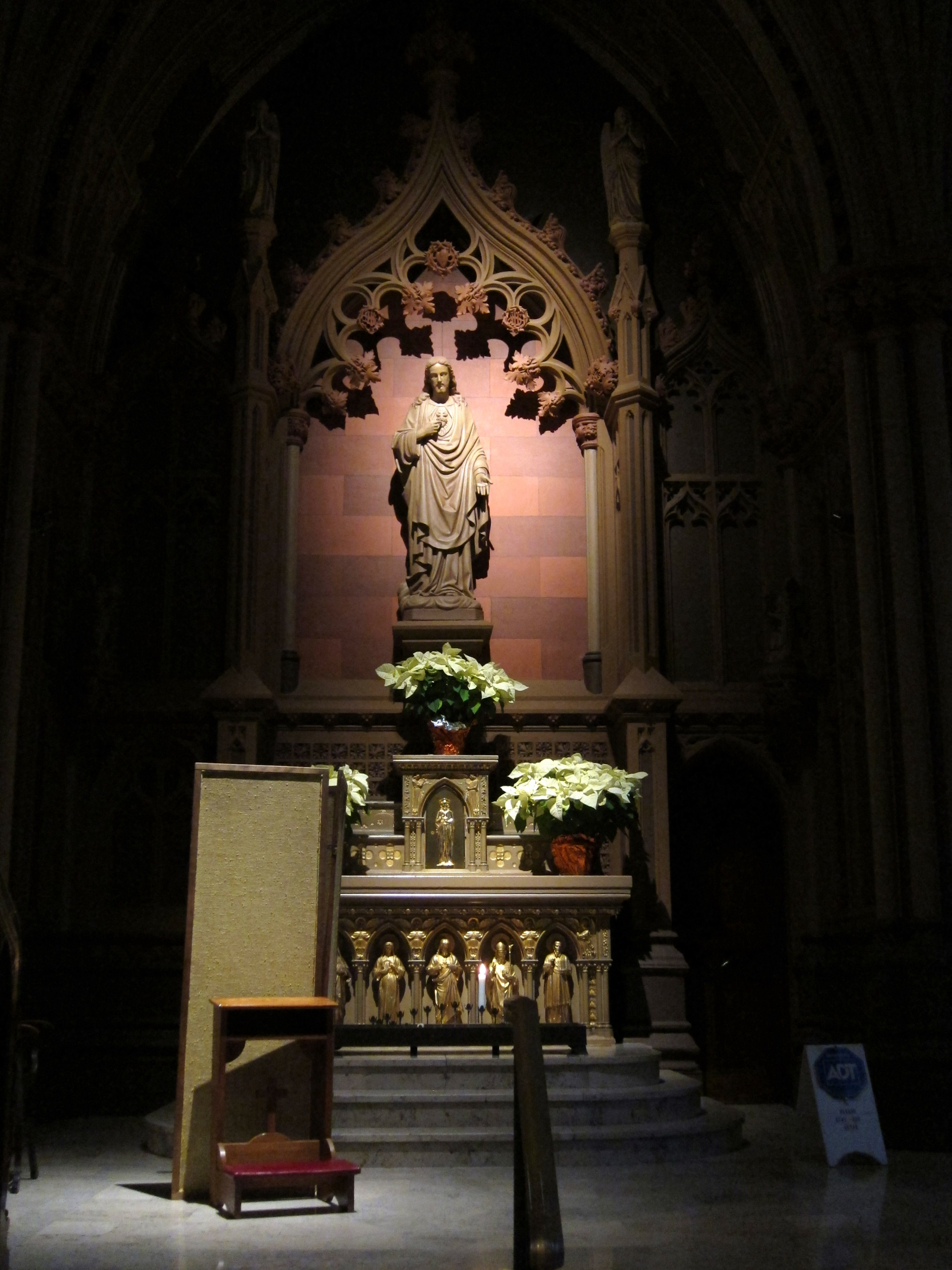
Sacred Heart statue and tabernacle (2012)

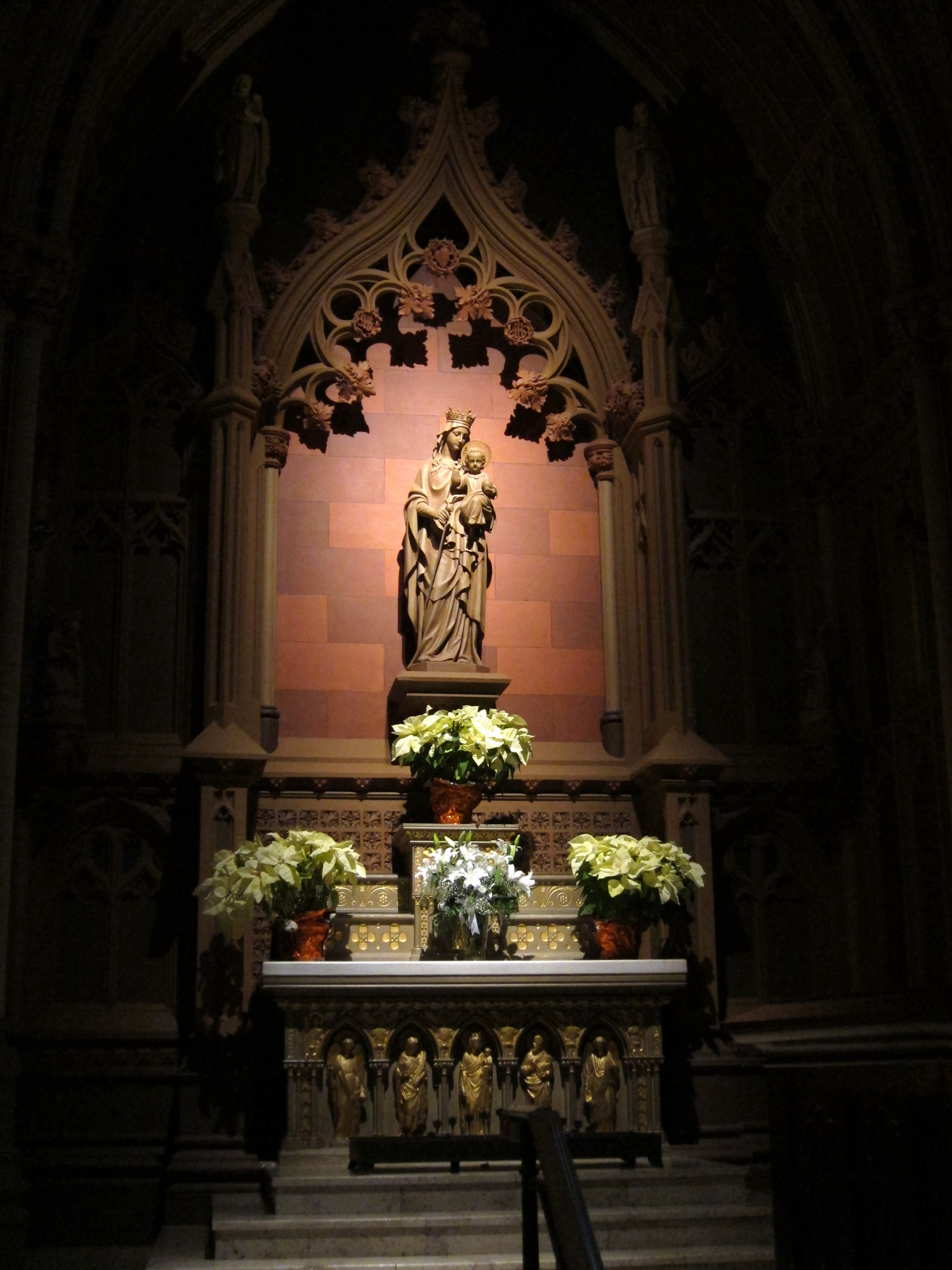
Statue of Blessed Virgin Mary (2012)

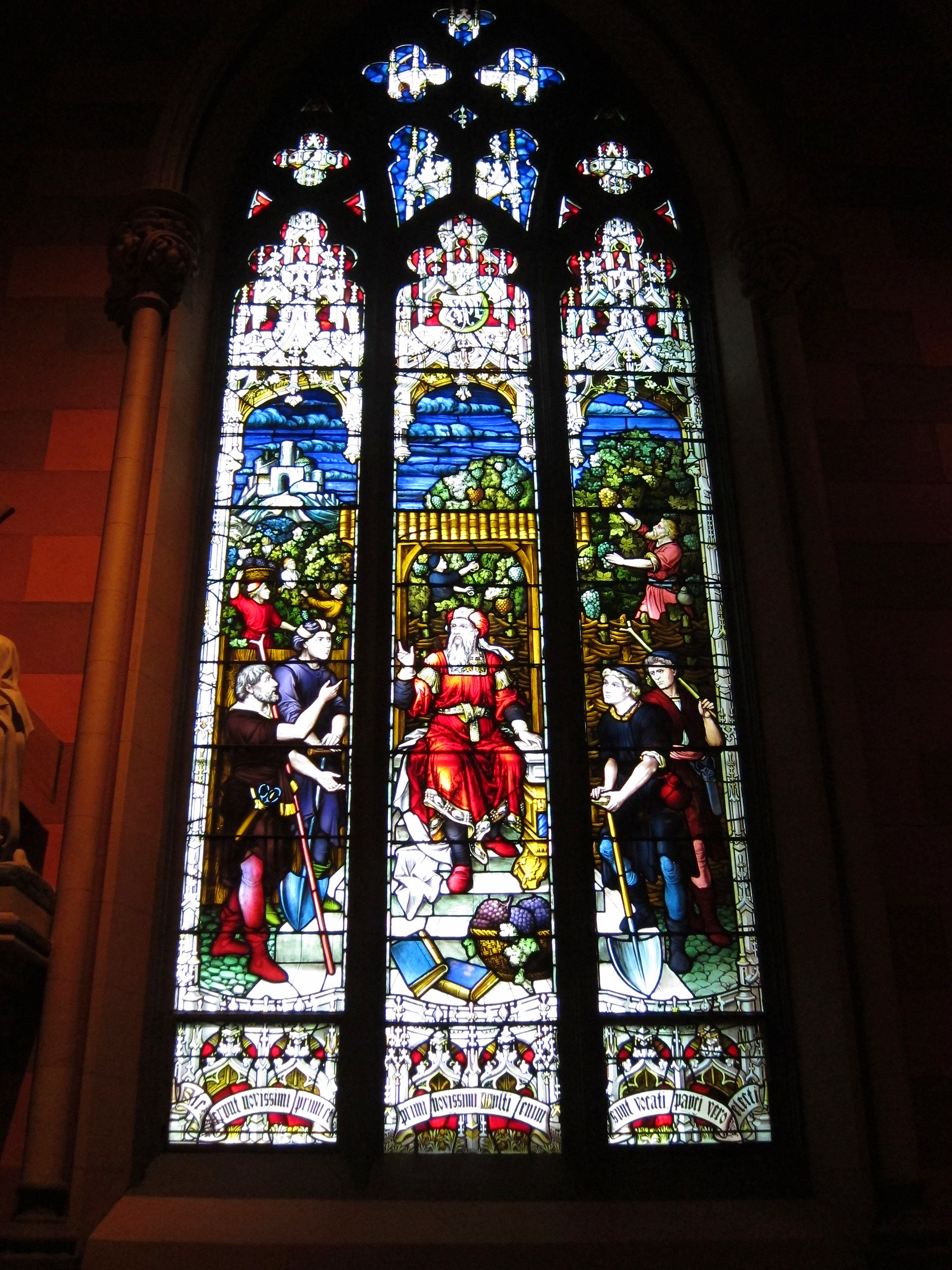
Parable of the Workers stained glass window (2012)

== See also ==
- List of Catholic cathedrals in the United States
- List of cathedrals in the United States
- Catholic Marian church buildings
- History of Albany, New York
- National Register of Historic Places listings in Albany, New York
