= Scharfenberger =

Scharfenberger is a surname. Notable people with the surname include:

- Edward Bernard Scharfenberger (born 1948), American Roman Catholic bishop
- Gerard Scharfenberger (born 1958), American politician
