= Edward Bernard Scharfenberger =

Roman Catholic Bishop of Albany

His Excellency, The Most Reverend Edward Bernard Scharfenberger
- Bishop Emeritus of Albany
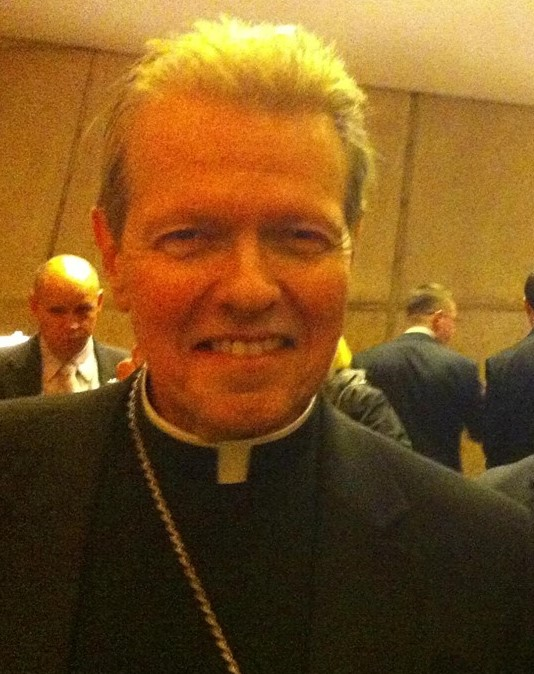
- Scharfenberger at his installation in 2014
- Archdiocese: New York
- Diocese: Albany
- Appointed: February 11, 2014
- Installed: April 10, 2014
- Retired: October 20, 2025
- Predecessor: Howard James Hubbard
- Successor: Mark O'Connell
- Previous post: Pastor of St. Matthias Ridgewood, Queens

Orders
- Ordination: July 2, 1973 by James Aloysius Hickey
- Consecration: April 10, 2014 by Timothy M. Dolan, Howard James Hubbard, and Nicholas Anthony DiMarzio

Personal details
- Born: May 29, 1948 (age 78) Brooklyn, New York, US
- Denomination: Roman Catholic
- Parents: Edward and Elaine Scharfenberger
- Education: Cathedral College of the Immaculate Conception; Pontifical Gregorian University; Pontifical Lateran University; Catholic University of America; Fordham University
- Motto: Lord, make me a channel of your peace

Styles of Edward Bernard Scharfenberger
- Reference style: His Excellency; The Most Reverend
- Spoken style: Your Excellency
- Religious style: Bishop

Edward Bernard Scharfenberger (born May 29, 1948) is a retired Roman Catholic prelate from the U.S. state of New York. Scharfenberger served as Bishop of the Roman Catholic Diocese of Albany from 2014 to 2025.

== Early life and education ==
Scharfenberger was born on May 29, 1948, in Bushwick, Brooklyn. He is the oldest of five children of Edward Scharfenberger Sr. (1920–2015) and Elaine Magdal (1920–2019). Scharfenberger has Russian Jewish ancestry through his mother.

Scharfenberger attended Our Lady of Miraculous Medal Elementary School in Ridgewood, Queens, and graduated from Cathedral Preparatory Seminary High School in Queens in 1965. In 1969, Scharfenberger graduated with a bachelor's degree in English from Cathedral College of the Immaculate Conception in Douglaston, Queens. Scharfenberger continued his studies at the Pontifical Gregorian University in Rome, where he earned a Bachelor of Sacred Theology degree in 1972.

== Priest of the Diocese of Brooklyn ==
Scharfenberger received his priestly ordination on July 2, 1973, in St. Peter's Basilica in Rome by Bishop James Hickey, rector of the North American College. He was incardinated into his native diocese, the Diocese of Brooklyn. Following his 1973 ordination, the diocese assigned Scharfenberger to the pastoral staffs at St. Stanislaus Kostka Parish in Maspeth, New York and St. Ephrem Parish in Brooklyn, New York.

Scharfenberger traveled again to Rome to attend the Alphonsian Academy of the Pontifical Lateran University, receiving a Licentiate in Sacred Theology in 1977. and a Licentiate of Canon Law from Catholic University of America in Washington, D.C. in 1980. He graduated with a J.D. degree from Fordham University in New York City in 1990 and was admitted to the New York State Bar Association in 1991.

Scharfenberger served as pastor of St. Matthias Parish in Ridgewood, Queens, from 2003 to 2014. In addition to doing pastoral work for decades, he held various roles in the diocesan curia. He served as a member of the diocesan tribunal, a judicial vicar, an adviser to the canonical ordinary, and a promoter of justice and member of the committee for sexually abused children. In 2013, Scharfenberger was appointed to the post of episcopal vicar for the Borough of Queens.

== Bishop of Albany ==
On February 11, 2014, Pope Francis appointed Scharfenberger as bishop of Albany. He was consecrated by Cardinal Timothy Dolan on April 10, 2014, at the Cathedral of the Immaculate Conception in Albany, with Bishops Howard Hubbard, and Nicholas DiMarzio acting as co-consecrators. During his tenure, he has written a column for the diocesan newspaper, The Evangelist.

Scharfenberger has served as a consultor to the Pontifical Commission for Religious Relations with the Jews, as well as five committees of the United States Conference of Catholic Bishops: the National Advisory Council, the Ecumenical and Interreligious Affairs Committee, the Administrative Committee, the Committee on Priorities and Plans, and the Subcommittee on the Church in Africa.

Scharfenberger said in 2018 that laypeople should investigate bishops accused of sexual abuse and failure to address cases of sexual abuse. In responding to Cardinal Donald Wuerl's suggestion that a committee of bishops should investigate allegations into other bishops in the aftermath of the sexual abuse scandal of former Cardinal Theodore McCarrick, Scharfenberger said that "we have reached a point where bishops alone investigating bishops is not the answer."

In March 2023, Scharfenberger announced that the diocese had filed for Chapter II bankruptcy protection. It was facing hundreds of legal claims from persons alleging that they had been victims of child sexual abuse.

=== Abortion ===
In February 2017, Scharfenberger criticized three Catholic politicians, (Albany Mayor Kathy Sheehan, State Assemblywoman Patricia Fahy and US Congressman Paul Tonko for supporting and attending a rally for Planned Parenthood. In January 2019, Scharfenberger wrote an open letter to New York Governor Andrew Cuomo in response to the passage of the 2019 state Reproductive Health Act:

I shudder to think of the consequences this law will wreak. You have already uttered harsh threats about the welcome you think pro-lifers are not entitled to in our state. Now you are demonstrating that you mean to write your warning into law. Will being pro-life one day be a hate crime in the State of New York?

=== Interfaith dialogue ===
In March 2016, at an interfaith event, Scharfenberger said: "Christians cannot be anti-Semitic and be Christian." In July 2019, Scharfenberger was appointed by Pope Francis as consultor to the Pontifical Commission for Religious Relations with the Jews.

In October 2018, Scharfenberger celebrated the feast day of Our Lady of Walsingham with Dean Leander Harding at the Episcopal Cathedral of All Saints in Albany, a celebration observed both by Catholics and Anglicans. Afterwards, Scharfenberger told the congregation that there were more similarities than differences between the two denominations.

=== Apostolic Administrator of Buffalo ===
On December 4, 2019, Francis appointed Scharfenberger as apostolic administrator of Diocese of Buffalo in New York, following the resignation of Bishop Richard Malone. According to The New York Times, Malone resigned his post following a Vatican investigation on the handling of sex abuse allegations in Buffalo.

The New York Times reported in December 2019 that Scharfenberger had "gained a reputation for taking a more empathetic approach in his handling of the abuse crisis." At a news conference announcing his appointment as apostolic administrator, Scharfenberger said, "I am here to walk with you, and I am [here] to help you heal." Scharfenberger's responsibilities as bishop of Albany were left unchanged.

On April 28, 2020, Scharfenberger notified 23 priests in the Diocese of Buffalo who had been either suspended due to sex crimes or accused of sex crimes that due to the diocese's bankruptcy agreement, it could no longer make retirement payments, health care, car insurance or dental care to them.

On January 15, 2021, Bishop Michael Fisher was installed as bishop of the Diocese of Buffalo, taking over for Scharfenberger.

=== Resignation ===
In September 2023, Scharfenberger submitted his mandatory resignation letter to the Vatican upon the occasion of his 75th birthday.

On October 20, 2025, Scharfenberger's resignation from the position of Bishop of Albany was accepted by Pope Leo XIV. The Pope appointed Bishop Mark O'Connell, an auxiliary bishop of the Archdiocese of Boston, to replace Scharfenberger.

=== St. Clare’s Hospital pension lawsuit ===
In December 2025, a Schenectady County jury found Scharfenberger and five other defendants liable for the collapse of the St. Clare’s Hospital pension fund, which left over 1,100 retirees with little to no benefits. The jury determined that Scharfenberger, who succeeded Bishop Howard Hubbard in 2014, had breached his fiduciary duties and assigned him 10% of the fault for the fund's failure.

The jury awarded the pensioners $54.2 million in compensatory damages, ruling that Scharfenberger and other leaders were acting as agents of the Roman Catholic Diocese of Albany when the wrongful acts occurred. Although the jury also cleared the way for punitive damages, the second phase of the trial was abruptly halted on December 16, 2025, after Scharfenberger filed for personal Chapter 7 bankruptcy.

== Personal life ==
Scharfenberger was diagnosed with colon cancer in November 2021 and underwent surgery. Scharfenberger speaks fluent Italian, Spanish and German. He is able to celebrate Mass in Polish and knows some Hebrew, Russian and Portuguese.

== Images ==
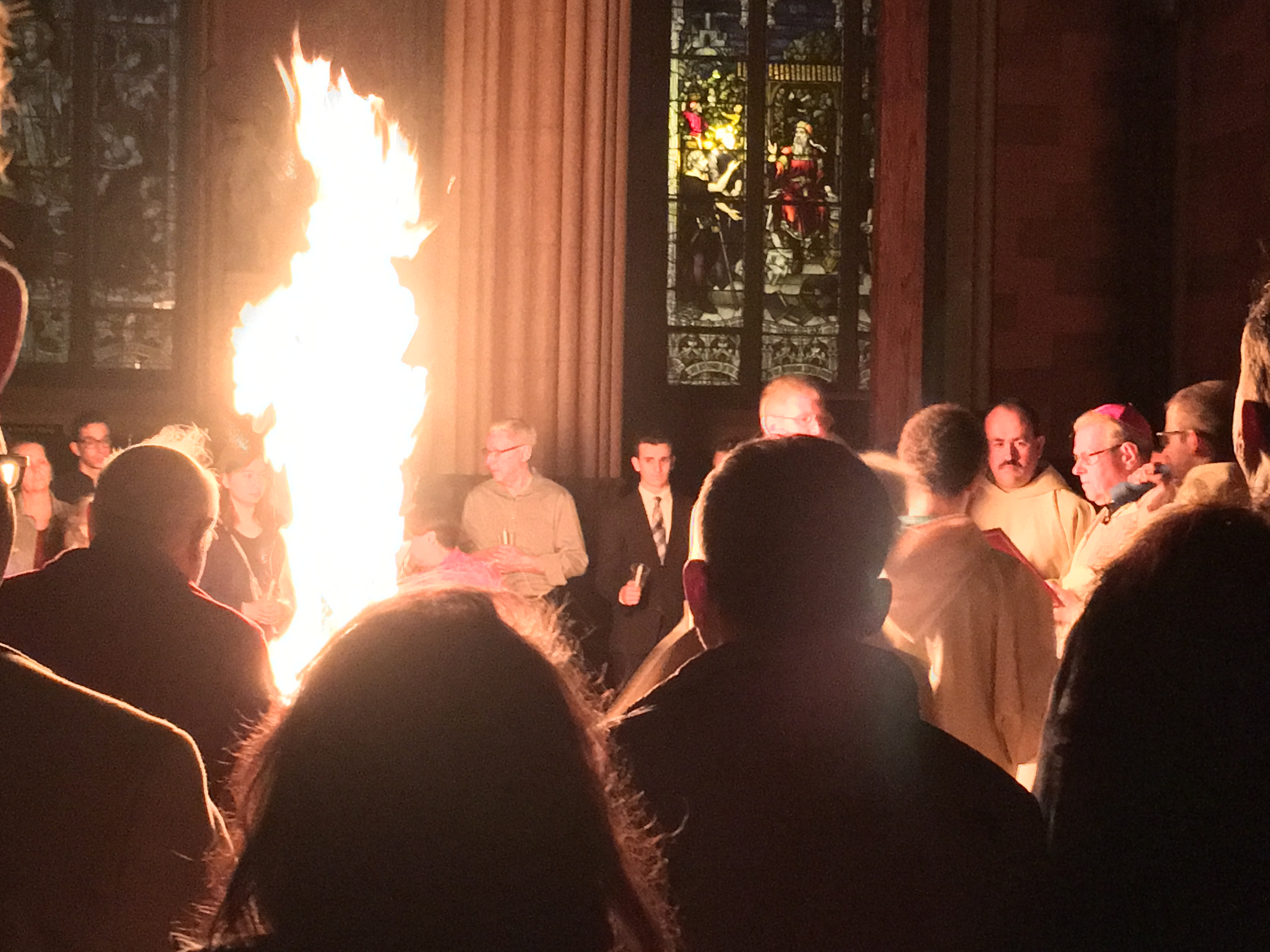
Scharfenberger performs the opening rites of the 2019 Easter Vigil in the light of the new fire at the Cathedral of the Immaculate Conception in Albany, New York

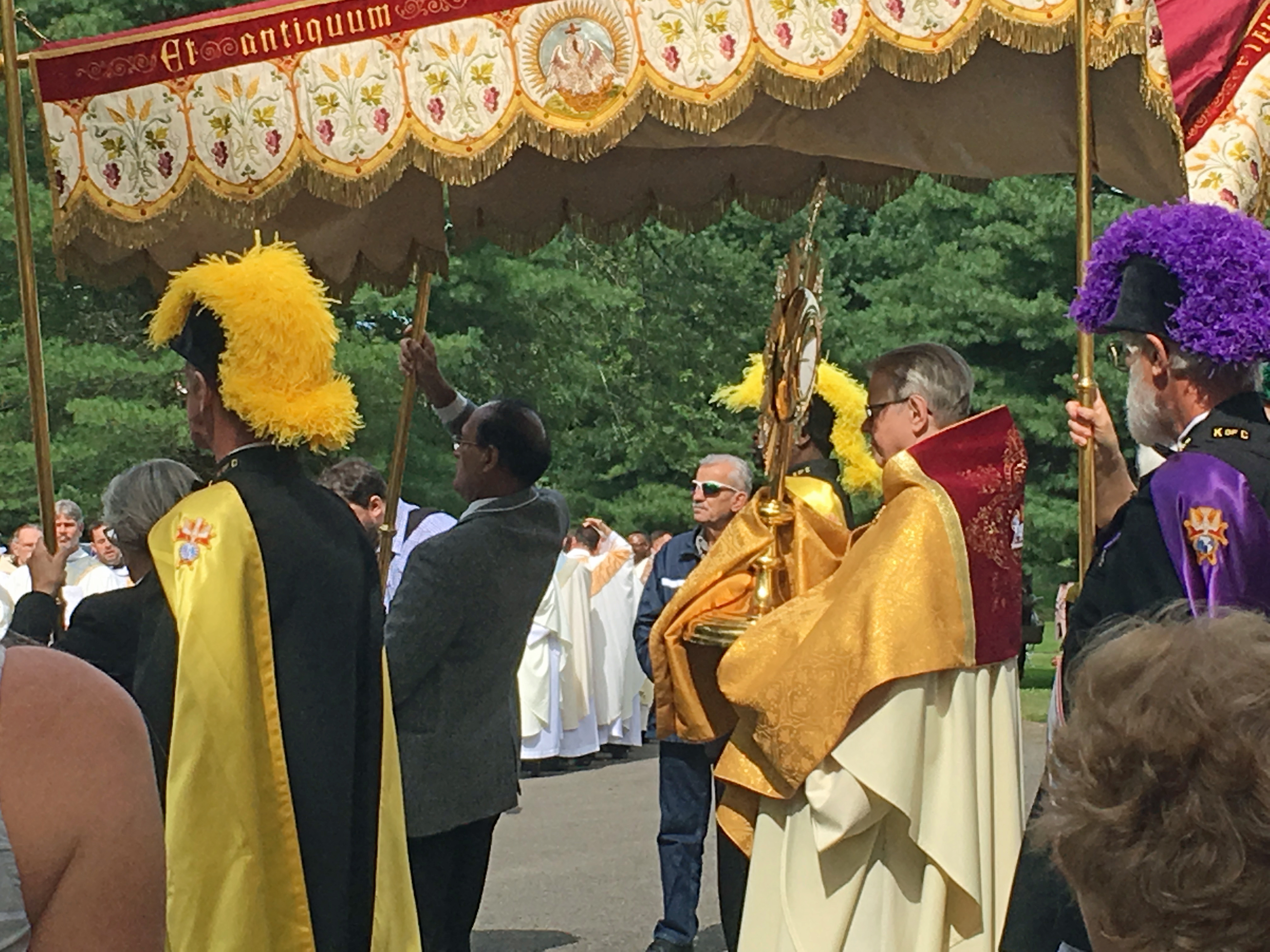
Scharfenberger carries the monstrance containing the blessed sacrament in the eucharistic procession at the National Shrine of the North American Martyrs in Auriesville, New York, 2018.

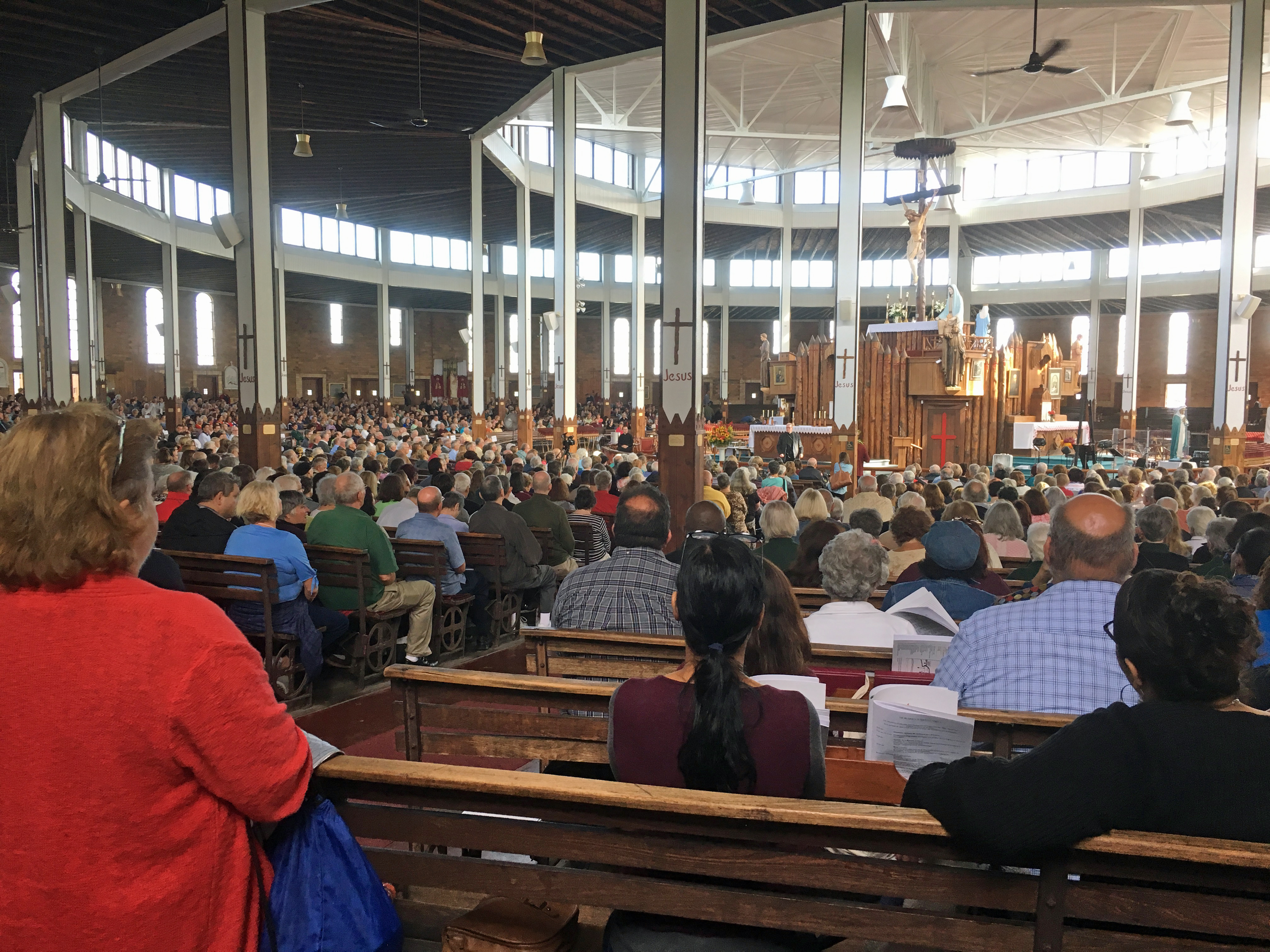
Scharfenberger addresses the congregation at the Shrine of the North American Martyrs, 2018.

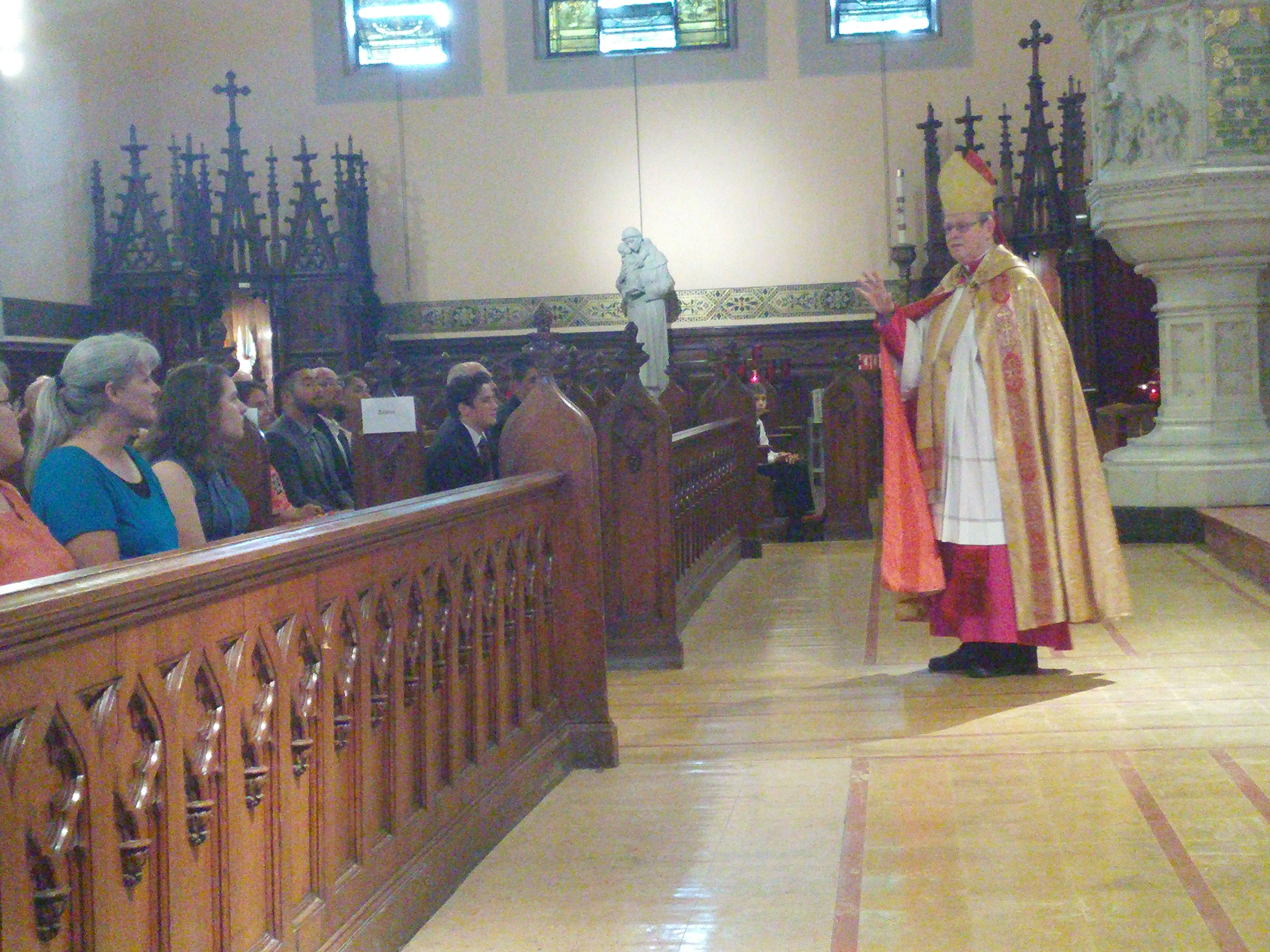
Scharfenberger confers the sacrament of confirmation at St, Joseph's Church in Troy, New York, June 2017

== See also ==
- Catholic Church hierarchy
- Catholic Church in the United States
- Historical list of the Catholic bishops of the United States
- List of Catholic bishops of the United States
- Lists of patriarchs, archbishops, and bishops

Catholic Church titles
Preceded by Howard James Hubbard	Bishop of Albany; 2014—2025	Succeeded by Mark O'Connell
