= Mansion Historic District =

Historic district in New York, United States

- U.S. National Register of Historic Places
- U.S. Historic district
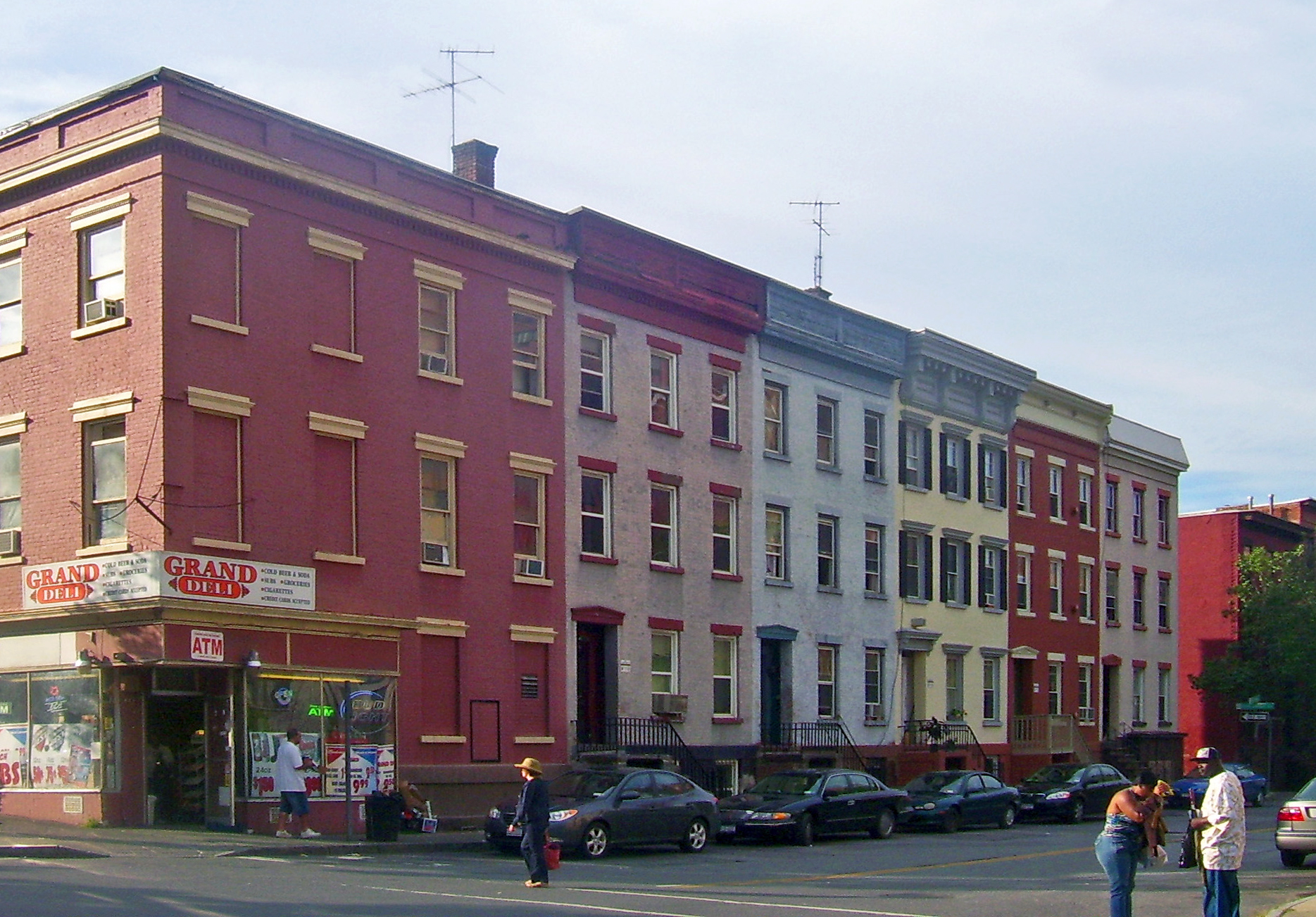
- Rowhouses on Grand north of Madison, 2008

- Location within New York Location within the United States
- Location: Albany, NY
- Coordinates: 42°38′46″N 73°45′23″W
- Area: 45 acres (18 ha)
- Built: 1820-1925
- Architectural style: Federal, Italianate, Greek Revival
- NRHP reference No.: 82003343
- Added to NRHP: 1982

The Mansion Historic District, sometimes referred to as Mansion Hill, is located south of Empire State Plaza in Albany, New York, United States. It takes its name from the nearby New York State Executive Mansion, which overlooks it. It is a 45-acre (18 ha), 16-block area with almost 500 buildings. Many of them are rowhouses and townhouses built in the middle and late 19th century that remain mostly intact today.

It was first developed in the early 19th century as a small group of estates for wealthy citizens. Later it was subdivided, becoming the first home for several waves of immigrant groups, most notably Italian Americans. In the mid-20th century it began to decline when the construction of Empire State Plaza cut it off from downtown and adversely impacted the neighborhood. A local neighborhood association was formed during this period and has been credited with helping the Mansion neighborhood recover and become a desirable place to live in the early 21st century. In 1982 it was designated a historic district by the city's Historic Resources Commission and listed on the National Register of Historic Places.

== Geography ==
The Mansion district is built on land that rises 100 feet (30 m) on its west from the flatlands along the Hudson River to its east, where the adjacent Pastures district is located. The South Mall Expressway, carrying traffic from the Dunn Memorial Bridge to Empire State Plaza separates the district from the Times Union Center and downtown to its north and northeast.

Erastus Corning Tower and the other modernist high-rises of Empire State Plaza loom over the district from the northwest. Along its west is a strip of land that includes the governor's mansion, Cathedral of the Immaculate Conception and the New York State Library. Lincoln Park is located to the southwest, and on the south the city's South End, with a greater mix of industrial and commercial properties, begins.

As to the district's actual boundaries, South Pearl Street (NY 32) on the east is the only side where the line follows a street for most of that direction. The north side is delineated on the corners by Madison Avenue (US 20) but there the boundary includes most of Van Zandt Street and most of the south side of Hamilton before returning to Madison along Philip Street and the rear lot lines of the properties at the Van Zandt corner. It goes west to Eagle Street via Madison and excludes the building across from the cathedral.

It follows Eagle's east side down to the corner of Park Avenue, then the middle of that street to include the houses on its south side and some of those on Philip south of it. It follows property lines to Charles Street, leaving out the large commercial property on Park between Philip and Grand. On that street it goes north for a few lots then crosses the block between Grand and Trinity Place just north of a large old factory. At that street it goes south a few lots, then returns to South Pearl after excluding another industrial property.

Charles, Elm, Myrtle and Wilbur streets are included in their entirety, as are Ash Grove, Bleecker and Madison places.

The district thus bounded contains 475 buildings, only 20 of which are non-contributing. Most are two- or three-story rowhouses. A few larger, similar commercial buildings are scattered throughout the district, and there are two churches. Development is dense and urban in character, with a few vacant lots.

Open space is provided by three parks, all along Philip Street, with two large ones across the street from each other between Elm and Myrtle streets. The western one has a basketball court.

== History ==
There were mansions in the Mansion District before the governor's mansion was built. In its earliest days of settlement, it was known as Albany's first suburban enclave, an area where the affluent built large homes and surrounded them with gardens and landscaping. Large-scale development did not begin there until the mid-19th century, after other areas of the city had been built out.

Italians, the last of several immigrant groups to make Mansion their first home in Albany, became identified with it after a huge influx in the late 19th century. The 20th century saw the neighborhood victimized by decline and urban renewal, but begin to recover in the later years.

=== 18th century ===
At the time of Albany's settlement in the 17th century, the city was concentrated in a stockaded area roughly equivalent to its present downtown. The area of the future Mansion neighborhood was across a deep ravine from it (since filled in) and thus did not attract much settlement. The first recorded settler in the area was a farmer named Hendri Hallenbake. When he died in 1766, his family subdivided the area and sold the lots to wealthy Albanyites who built large houses for themselves.

After the Revolution, one of those new residents was Peter W. Yates, a successful local lawyer and militia colonel during the war. He was known to have been living there in 1791, in a house at what is now the intersection of Ashgrove and Trinity places. In 1807, three years before he left Albany for Montgomery County, he sold the house to James Kane.

=== 19th century ===
Kane, a successful merchant who had made his fortune in trade in the Mohawk Valley to the west, would become the landowner who made the most impact on the future neighborhood despite a relatively short tenure in it. In a series of purchases, he expanded the estate to include most of the present district, excepting the sections north of Madison Avenue and west of Grand Street, as well as land as far south as Arch Street. He gained fame statewide for his hospitality. After he lost his fortune in the Panic of 1819, the estate was seized by his creditors.

Outside his land, the first development took place. A Federal style house was built at 146 Madison Avenue in 1828, the oldest extant house in the district today. Nearby, 143 Madison went up five years later. It, too, is a Federal building, but with some exterior alterations from the later 19th century. After the opening of the Erie Canal in 1825 sparked economic growth, new residential land was sought. While most of it would come north and west of downtown, Trinity Place was opened (as Broad Street) in 1836. The first rowhouses in the future Mansion Historic District, 16–24 and 39–45a Trinity, were built in 1839–40 along with 2 Ashgrove Street nearby. David Orr, one of the wealthiest men in Albany, built the row at 57-65 Grand around the same time, the last houses in the district built in High Greek Revival style. This marks the beginning of the Mansion neighborhood as it is known today.

Archibald McIntyre and Henry Yates bought the Kane estate in 1834. It was used as a temporary governor's mansion by William H. Seward, and possibly others. Yates spent his later years in the house, selling off the portion north of Ashgrove and Westerlo streets around the same time the rowhouses were being built on Trinity. When Yates died in 1854, the house became the Albany Female Academy. Eleven years later, the academy moved to its current quarters and Kane's estate was demolished to make way for a church.

Throughout the early 1840s, there was little new construction due to the economic slowdown in the wake of the Panic of 1837, other than a small row on Hamilton Street. When construction resumed in the late 1840s, there would be a new row on Bleecker, and individual rowhouses all over the district. Orr built one of the most distinctive rows in the district, 6-10 Madison, from 1845 to 1848 specifically with wealthy homebuyers in mind. The pointed-arch windows and Gothic tracery suggest the possible influence of Andrew Jackson Downing's architectural theories.

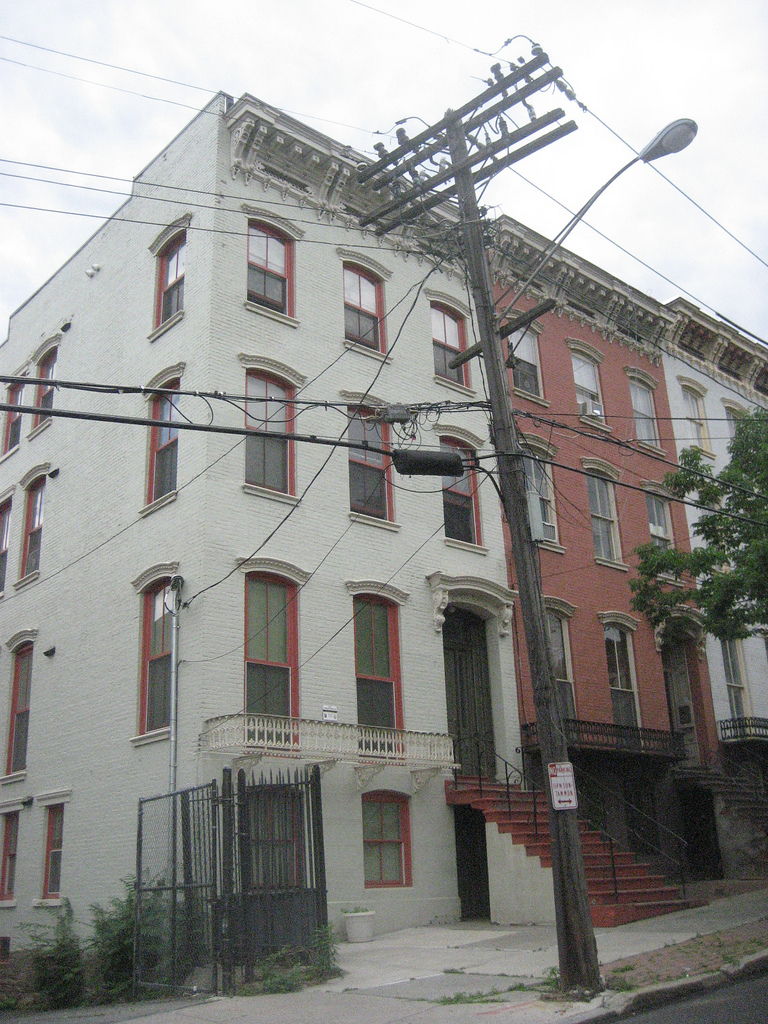
Mid-19th century rowhouses

The Mansion District took off in the 1850s. The city's economy was booming due to the canal, the railroads and the industrialization taking place. The new workers, many of them Irish immigrants, coming to the city needed houses, and the Pastures had mostly been built out. Developers therefore looked to the emptier lands to the west. Orr developed houses on Madison, Myrtle and Park as well as Grand Street. He was joined by Charles and Lewis Seymour, stonemasons who built the row at 44–50 Grand and possibly several others. Lewis Seymour's slightly unusual frame house still stands at 14 Wilbur Street.

Another major builder of the Mansion District was James Eaton, superintendent of building at the New York State Capitol for some time during this period. He brought some newer architectural styles to the district, such as the Italianate row at 46–68 Elm Street, with slightly gabled projecting pavilions on each building giving the impression of a separate tower, more typical of detached Italianate villas of the time. He also built the Gothic Revival 78–92 Grand Street, with a roof finial dividing its symmetrical combined facades.

During this era the district became home to a large population of German immigrants, many of them Jews fleeing the collapse of the Revolution of 1848. They developed South Pearl into a local retail center.

=== 20th and 21st centuries ===
By 1876 the district was almost entirely built out, with the exception of some areas along Madison. The neighborhood continued to prosper in the last decades of the century, with the help of another immigrant community that would shape it. Italians began moving in. They built the Italian Renaissance Revival St. Anthony's Church at Grand and Madison in 1908, and at the next census two years later they had become the fourth largest ethnic group in the city of Albany. Ten years later, they were the largest, and had displaced the Irish from Park and Myrtle avenues. The Mansion became known as the city's "Garlic Core" due to this concentration of Italians.

It retained this character well into the century. "Madison below South Pearl, as late as 1941," William Kennedy wrote in O Albany!, "could be taken for a street in Italy" due to the many Italian names on businesses along that street. One of those, Lombardo's, has remained on Madison since 1933 and become one of the Capital District's best-regarded Italian restaurants.

The development of Empire State Plaza had a major negative impact on the Mansion District. Adjacent neighborhoods were razed, and it was cut off from downtown by not only the plaza but the South Mall Arterial. Many residents left the area for the suburbs due to the impact of the construction. The diocese of Albany closed St. Anthony's due to a lack of parishioners in 1973. Urban blight began to appear, and housing prices dropped as low as $5,000.

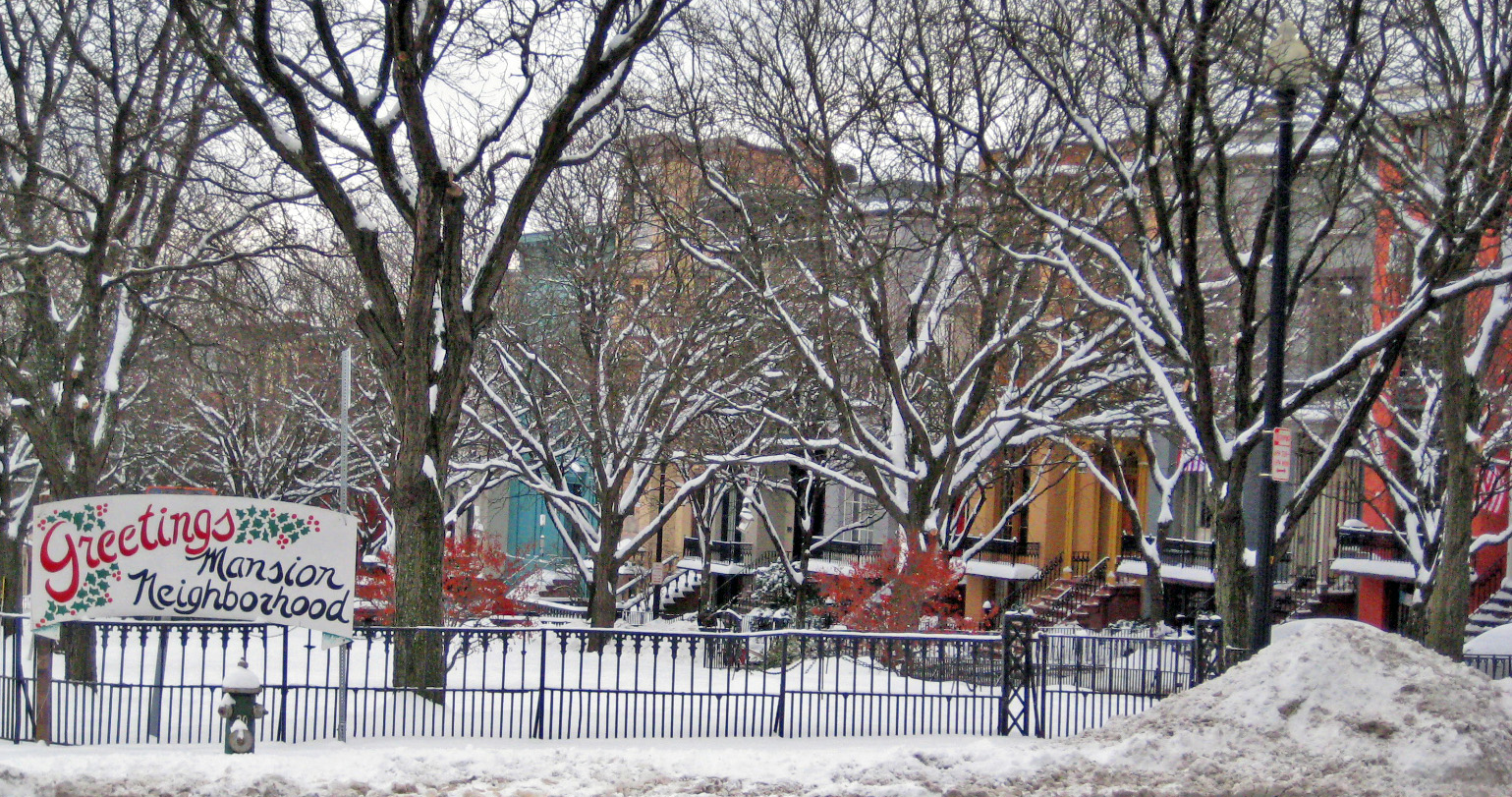
Mansion Neighborhood Christmas sign in Bleecker Park, with Madison Place in background

Some new residents decided to buy at those prices. In 1975, two of them founded the Mansion Neighborhood Association (MNA) to advocate for the community and oppose demolition plans. The organization persisted, and has been credited with helping the neighborhood rebound in the early 21st century (although some residents complain that neglect continues in some areas, and arson destroyed several houses on Madison Place in 2007) The Albany Free School, a democratic school founded on Elm Street in 1969, also became one of its key institutions.

Houses in the area sell well due to their walkable proximity to the Plaza and downtown, and newer arrivals praise the neighborhood's sense of community. One new resident, Eliot Spitzer, invited Mansion residents in for a house party in 2007, a few months after he moved into the governor's mansion. In the late 2000s, another community group bought St. Anthony's from the diocese, restored it and converted it into a cultural center. It is now known as Grand Street Community Arts. Like the city's other historic districts, new construction or expansion within the Mansion district is reviewed by the city's Historic Resources Commission (HRC), a group of nine citizens with an interest in architecture, history or historic preservation appointed by the mayor. The HRC also considers new city landmark designations.

== See also ==
- National Register of Historic Places listings in Albany, New York
