= Edmund Gibbons =

American prelate

His Excellency, The Most Reverend Edmund Francis Gibbons
- Bishop of Albany; Titular Bishop of Verbe
- In office: 1919-1954

Orders
- Ordination: May 27, 1893 by Lucido Maria Parocchi
- Consecration: March 25, 1919 by Giovanni Bonzano

Personal details
- Born: September 16, 1868 White Plains, New York, US
- Died: June 19, 1964 (aged 95) Albany, New York, US
- Denomination: Roman Catholic
- Parents: James and Joanna (née Ray) Gibbons
- Education: Niagara University; Pontifical North American College
- Motto: Ut omnes unum sint (That all may be one)

Edmund Francis Gibbons (September 16, 1868 – June 19, 1964) was an American prelate of the Roman Catholic Church. He served as bishop of the Diocese of Albany in New York State from 1919 to 1954.

== Biography ==
Edmund Gibbons was born on September 16, 1868, in White Plains, New York, to Irish immigrants James and Joanna (née Ray) Gibbons. His father was a stonecutter who helped build the New York State Capitol in Albany, New York.

Gibbons first attended Niagara College in Lewiston, New York. Deciding to become a priest, he the Seminary of Our Lady of Angels at Niagara College. He later continued his studies at the Pontifical North American College in Rome.

=== Priesthood ===
Gibbons was ordained to the priesthood in Rome for the Diocese of Buffalo on May 27, 1893, by Cardinal Lucido Maria Parocchi. After his ordination, Bishop Stephen V. Ryan appointed Gibbons as his personal secretary. He was named superintendent of Catholic schools in the diocese in 1900. Four years later, he also became pastor of St. Vincent's Parish in Attica, New York. Gibbons was transferred in 1916 to St. Teresa's Parish in Buffalo.

=== Bishop of Albany ===
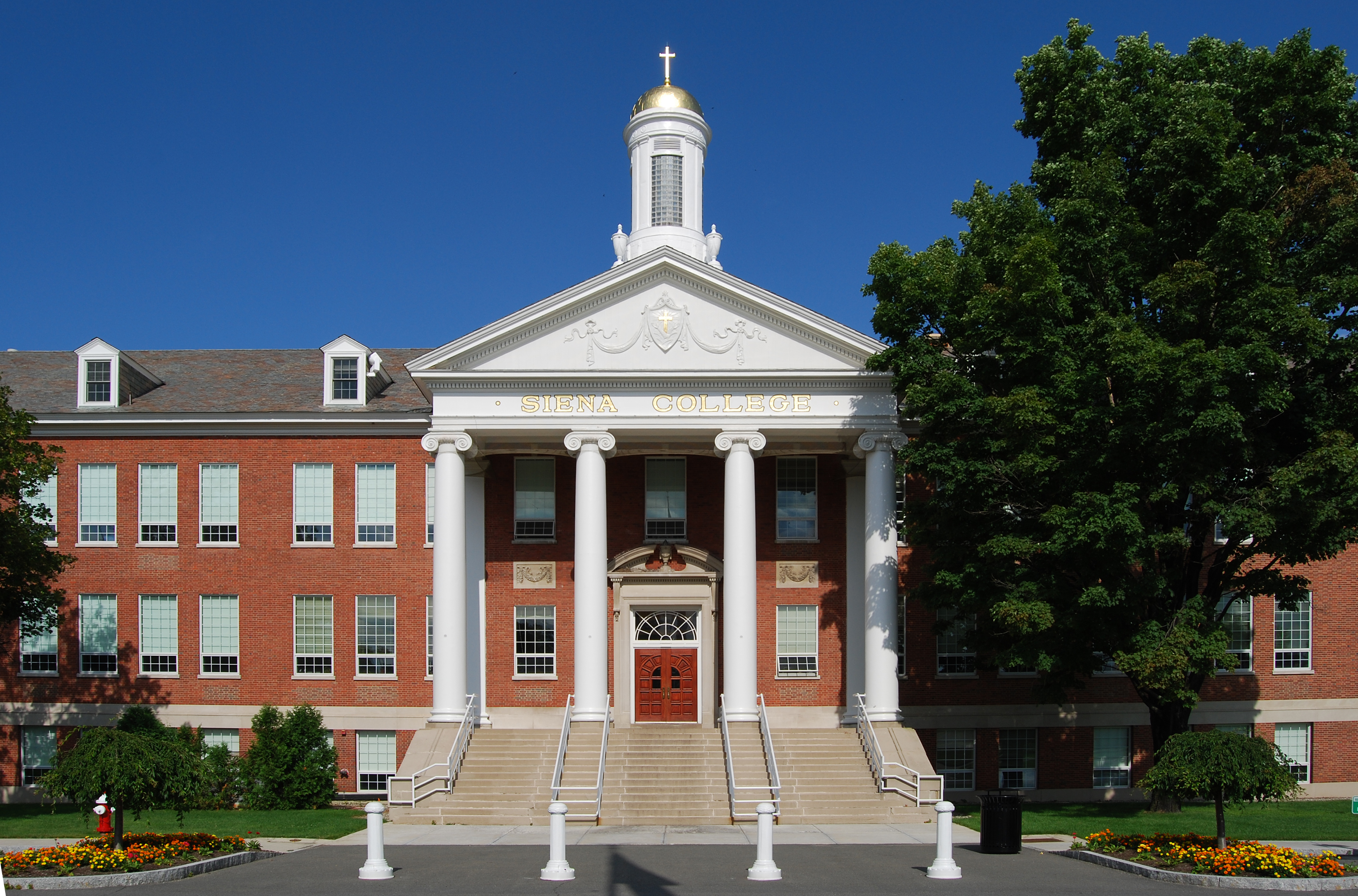
Siena College, Loudonville, New York (2011)

On March 10, 1919, Gibbons was appointed the sixth bishop of Albany by Pope Benedict XV. He received his episcopal consecration on March 25, 1919, from Archbishop Giovanni Bonzano, with Bishops John Grimes and Thomas Walsh serving as co-consecrators. In 1934, Gibbons served as chair of the New York State Catholic Welfare Committee. He also established The College of Saint Rose in Albany, Siena College in Loudonville, New York, Mater Christi Seminary, 4 high schools, 26 grade schools, and the diocesan newspaper, The Evangelist.

On May 27, 1953, Gibbons celebrated the 60th anniversary of his ordination. As the oldest living bishop, he was dean of the American hierarchy.

=== Retirement and death ===
After thirty-five years as bishop, Gibbons retired on November 10, 1954, to a simple apartment in the Mater Christi seminary; he was named titular bishop of Verbe on the same date. Gibbons died in Albany on June 19, 1964, at age 95.

== Episcopal succession ==
Catholic Church titles
Preceded by Thomas Cusack	Bishop of Albany; 1919—1954	Succeeded by William Scully
