= Bleecker Park =

Park in Albany, New York, United States

Coordinates: 42°38′50″N 73°45′32.07″W

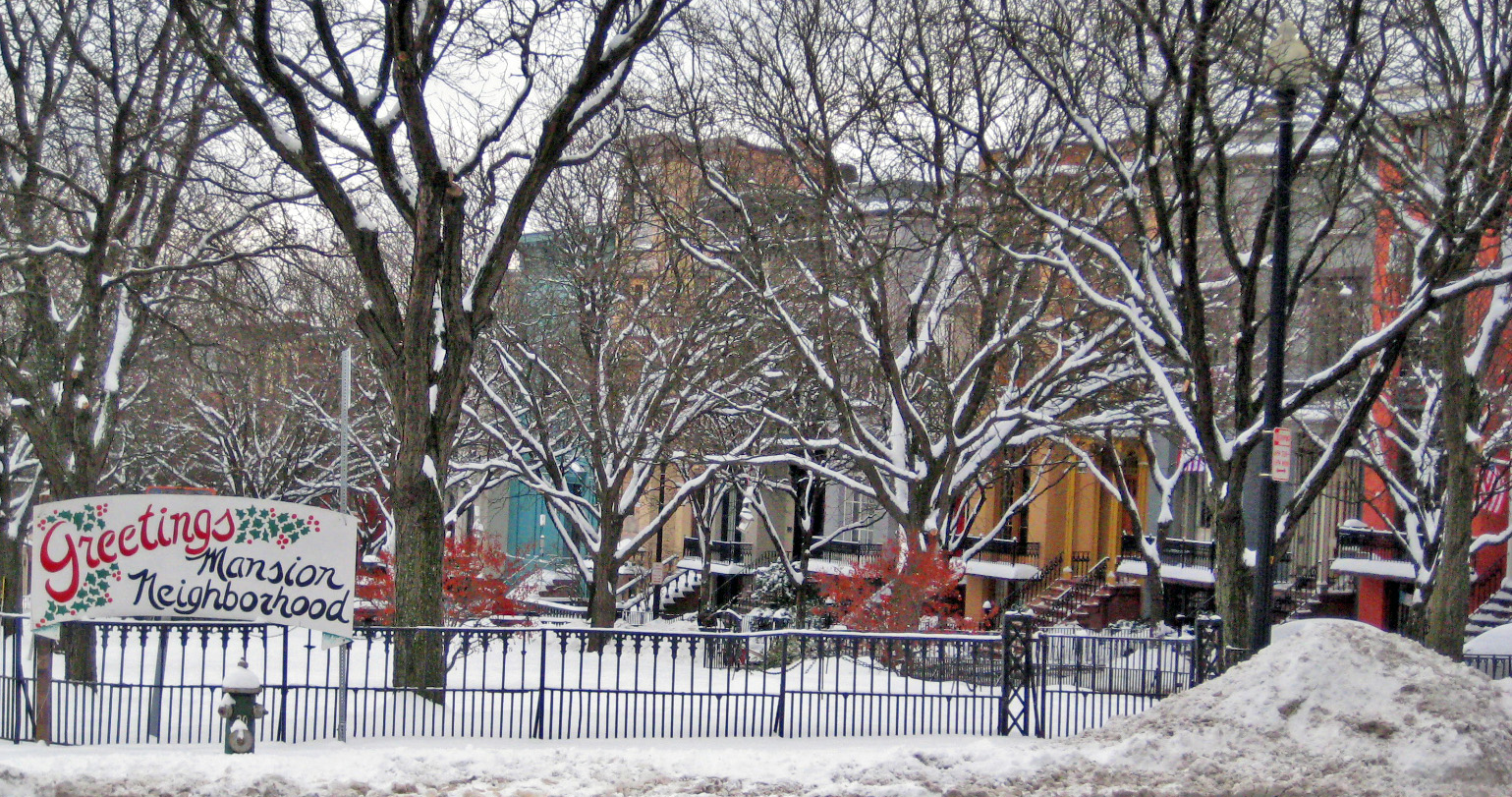
- Mansion neighborhood Christmas sign in Bleecker Park, with Madison Place in background
- Interactive map of Bleecker Park
- Type: Urban park
- Location: Albany, New York
- Area: 16,275 square feet (0.15120 ha)
- Created: 1835
- Operator: City of Albany
- Parking: Off-site at nearby Empire State Plaza

Bleecker Park is a small .37-acre (0.15 ha) urban park in Albany, New York. The park is triangle-shaped, bounded by Madison Place to the south, Madison Avenue to the north, and Eagle Street to the west. The Cathedral of Immaculate Conception is across Eagle Street from the park, while Madison Place, which is only one block-long, consists of rowhouses primarily in High Gothic and Italianate architecture, built in the mid-to-late-19th century. Across from the park on Madison Street is the Empire State Plaza East Parking Garage, built in 1999/2000. The park features the oldest fountain in the city which is surrounded by a small circular garden, two circular beds are also in the park and each feature a shrub surrounded flowers, these small gardens make Bleecker Park "a most charming and restrained Victorian public garden" according to an article in the Albany Times Union.

== History ==
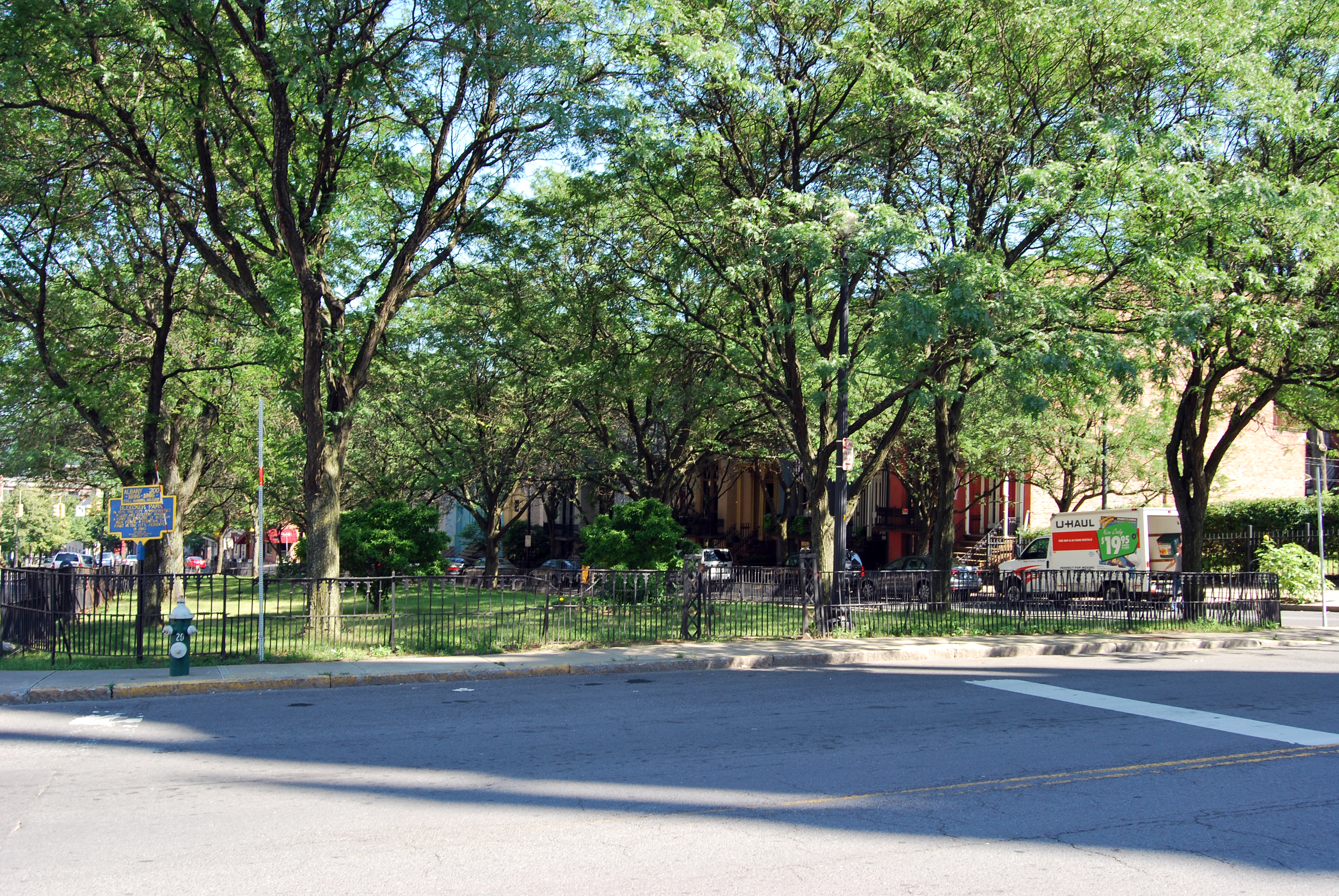
Bleecker Park during the summer

Bleecker Park was established in 1835 by the erection of an iron fence. The Cathedral of Immaculate Conception was built across Eagle Street from the park in 1852. In 1863 the first public fountain in the city was erected in the park, a gift from William Fleming. Prior to 1867 Madison Place was named Madison Avenue and the current Madison Avenue was Lydius Street, Madison Place receiving its current name in May, 1867 and Madison Avenue in July, 1867.

In 1986 as part of the 300th anniversary of the Dongan Charter incorporating Albany as a city, the Bleecker Park fence enclosure received a new coat of paint thanks to inmate labor from the Hudson Correctional Facility. Bleecker Park was one of four places in the city to be awarded the Sense of Place award as part of fifth annual Albany History Fair in 2004.
