= Howard Hubbard =

American Catholic bishop (1938–2023)

His Excellency, The Most Reverend Howard Hubbard
- Bishop of Albany
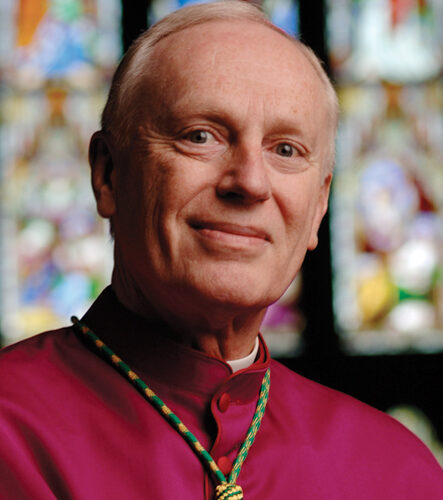
- Church: Catholic Church
- Diocese: Albany
- Appointed: February 1, 1977
- Installed: March 27, 1977
- Retired: April 10, 2014
- Predecessor: Edwin B. Broderick
- Successor: Edward Bernard Scharfenberger

Orders
- Ordination: December 18, 1963 by Martin John O'Connor
- Consecration: March 27, 1977 by Terence Cooke, Edwin Broderick, and Edward Joseph Maginn

Personal details
- Born: Howard James Hubbard; October 31, 1938 Troy, New York, U.S.
- Died: August 19, 2023 (aged 84) Albany, New York, U.S.
- Spouse: Jennifer Barrie (m. July 2023-his death)
- Motto: Rejoice, we are God's people

Styles of Howard James Hubbard
- Reference style: His Excellency; The Most Reverend
- Spoken style: Your Excellency
- Religious style: Bishop

Ordination history of Howard Hubbard
History
Episcopal consecration
- Consecrated by: Terence Cooke
Episcopal succession
Bishops consecrated by Howard Hubbard as principal consecrator
- Harry Joseph Flynn: 1986

Howard James Hubbard (October 31, 1938 – August 19, 2023) was an American Catholic prelate from the U.S. state of New York who served as bishop of the Diocese of Albany from 1977 to 2014.

A Troy, New York native, Hubbard was ordained as a priest in 1963. He founded a drug rehabilitation center and a crisis intervention center, worked as a "street priest" in Albany's South End, and served as vicar general of the Diocese of Albany. In 1977, Hubbard was appointed and consecrated as bishop of Albany. He was the youngest Catholic bishop in the United States at that time and was dubbed "the boy bishop." Hubbard chaired the U.S. Conference of Catholic Bishops (USCCB) Committee for International Justice and Peace and served on the Subcommittees on the Catholic Campaign for Human Development and the Church in Africa. He was appointed by Pope John Paul II to the Vatican's Secretariat for Non-Christians (later known as the Pontifical Council for Interreligious Dialogue). Known as a liberal bishop, Hubbard was a supporter of the ecumenical movement; he also led an organization called New Yorkers Against the Death Penalty. Hubbard was criticized for his handling of the clergy sex abuse crisis; in 2013, he apologized for his shortcomings and lack of transparency in this regard.

In 2004, Hubbard was accused of having engaged in homosexual activity with adult males. He denied the accusations, and an external investigation led by a former U.S. attorney found no credible evidence to support them. After the Child Victims Act was signed into law in New York in 2019, multiple plaintiffs filed lawsuits alleging that Hubbard had engaged in child sexual abuse. Hubbard denied the allegations and took a voluntary leave of absence from public ministry. In 2022, Hubbard petitioned the Vatican for laicization; his request was not granted. He married a woman in a civil ceremony shortly before his death in 2023.

== Early life and education ==
Howard Hubbard was born on October 31, 1938, in Troy, New York to Howard and Elizabeth Hubbard. He attended St. Patrick's School and La Salle Institute in Troy, and also attended Mater Christi Seminary. He furthered his studies at St. Joseph's Seminary in Yonkers, New York, obtaining a Bachelor of Philosophy degree.

Hubbard later went to Rome to study at the Pontifical Gregorian University, where he received a Licentiate in Sacred Theology. Hubbard later engaged in graduate study in social services at the Catholic University of America in Washington, D.C.

== Early priesthood ==
While in Rome, Hubbard was ordained to the priesthood at the Church of St. Ignatius in Rome for the Diocese of Albany by Archbishop Martin John O'Connor on December 18, 1963. After his ordination, the diocese assigned Hubbard as associate pastor of St. Joseph's Parish in Schenectady, New York in 1964, and at the Cathedral of the Immaculate Conception Parish in Albany, New York from 1964-1965. He also did Graduate Studies at Catholic University of America in Washington D.C. from 1965-1966 and was chaplain at Kenwood Academy in Albany from 1966-1967. From 1967-1977, he was the moderator of the Catholic Interracial Council of the Roman Catholic Diocese of Albany. From 1968-1977, Bishop Howard Hubbard was a member of the Ecumenical and Interreligious Commission of the Roman Catholic Diocese of Albany and was chairman from 1972-1977. From 1972-1977, Bishop Howard Hubbard was a member of the Priests Personnel Board of the Roman Catholic Diocese of Albany and was chairman from 1973-1977. From 1972-1974, Bishop Howard Hubbard was the director of Urban Apostolate of the Roman Catholic Diocese of Albany. From 1974-1977, Bishop Howard Hubbard was the Director of Pastoral Planning for the Diocese of Albany. From 1974-1977, Bishop Howard Hubbard was a member of the Parish Realignment Committee for the Roman Catholic Diocese of Albany. Hubbard also founded Hope House, a drug rehabilitation center, and Providence House, a crisis intervention center, respectively both in Albany in 1967. He also served as a "street priest" in Albany's South End. Bishop Edwin Broderick named Hubbard as his vicar general and later apostolic administrator from 1976-1977.

== Bishop of Albany ==
On February 2, 1977, Hubbard was appointed bishop of Albany by Pope Paul VI. He received his episcopal consecration from Cardinal Terence James Cooke at Siena College in Loudonville, New York on March 27, 1977. Hubbard was the youngest bishop in the country at the time, and was dubbed "the boy bishop."

Hubbard served as chairman of the U.S. Conference of Catholic Bishops (USCCB) Committee for International Justice and Peace and on the Subcommittees on the Catholic Campaign for Human Development and the Church in Africa. He was also a member of other national bishops’ committees, including the Committees on Human Values, Marriage and the Family, Communication, Laity and North American College.

Hubbard was appointed by Pope John Paul II to the Vatican's Secretariat for Non-Christians (later known as the Pontifical Council for Interreligious Dialogue). He was a supporter of the ecumenical movement, serving as Catholic co-chair of the Oriental Orthodox-Roman Catholic Consultation. Under his leadership as bishop, the diocese maintained an active Catholic-Jewish dialogue.

During his tenure as bishop, Hubbard presided over a nearly $20 million renovation project at the Cathedral of the Immaculate Conception in Albany He also led a parish consolidation process—known as "Called to BE Church"—that resulted in the closing of 33 parishes.

Hubbard had a reputation as a liberal bishop. He was known for progressive views on drug addiction and the prison population, and for advocacy of sometimes unpopular social justice issues. He was also noted for his anti-poverty efforts. Upon becoming bishop, Hubbard sold a large bishop's residence where previous bishops had lived with a domestic staff. He also dispensed with having a car and a driver. In 1992, he began living "in almost monastic simplicity in a nondescript, squat brick building" across the street from the Cathedral of the Immaculate Conception. It was reported in 2013 that Hubbard collected an annual salary of $33,508, the same salary as any diocesan priest with a similar number of years of service. Hubbard once sued to prevent clinics providing abortion services to women from opening in Albany and Hudson, New York. He headed New Yorkers Against the Death Penalty, a group opposing capital punishment.

=== Sexual misconduct allegations ===
In February 2004, Hubbard was accused of having engaged in homosexual activity with two different men in the 1970s. Hubbard denied both accusations and asserted that he had never broken his vow of celibacy. The diocese hired former U.S. Attorney Mary Jo White to investigate the allegations. In June 2004, White released a 200-page report stating that she had found no credible evidence to support the accusations against Hubbard. White said she found "no evidence that Hubbard 'led a homosexual lifestyle, engaged in homosexual relations or visited gay bars'". White indicated that her investigative team had reviewed more than 20,000 documents and conducted over 300 interviews in connection with the Hubbard investigation.

Following New York's passage of the Child Victims Act in 2019, a man filed a civil lawsuit accusing Hubbard of sexually abusing him when he was a teenaged boy in the 1990s. On August 16th, Hubbard responded as follows:

"'With full and complete confidence, I can say this allegation is false. I have never sexually abused anyone in my life. I have trust in the canonical and civil legal processes and believe my name will be cleared in due course.'"

Hubbard also announced that he was taking a voluntary leave of absence from public ministry until the lawsuit was resolved.

On September 16, 2019, an unnamed woman alleged that Hubbard and two other priests sexually abused her in the rectory of Immaculate Conception Church in Schenectady in the late 1970s when she was a teenager. Hubbard denied this accusation as well.

In October 2019, a lawsuit was filed in which Hubbard was accused of molesting a teenaged boy at a Troy church in the 1970s. Hubbard denied the allegations through his attorney.

Also in October 2019, a lawsuit was filed in which Hubbard and another priest were accused of molesting a boy at a priest's residence in the 1980s. Hubbard denied the allegations.

On August 12, 2020, a South Carolina resident accused Hubbard of child sex abuse in a lawsuit filed with the New York Supreme Court. The plaintiff alleged that Hubbard sexually abused him when he was ten years old on a 1975 field trip to the US Military Academy in West Point. The assault allegedly happened on an empty church bus. The plaintiff said that when he started feeling ill at West Point, Hubbard escorted him back to the bus to rest. Hubbard denied the allegations.

As of 2023, eleven persons had claimed that Hubbard subjected them to childhood sex abuse.

=== Clergy abuse crisis ===
In 2002, Hubbard removed six diocesan priests from active ministry due to clergy abuse. One of those six priests was Father Edward James Pratt, the vice chancellor of the Diocese. In a later lawsuit, one of Pratt's alleged victims stated that Pratt had abused him multiple times at Pratt's place of residence; Hubbard lived across the hall from Pratt at the time.

In 2004, the Diocese of Albany reported that 19 priests had credible accusations of sexual abuse against minors over the past 53 years, and that investigations were pending into allegations involving ten current and former priests. That same year, the diocese created the Independent Mediation Assistance Program to financially assist victims. On March 19, 2011, Hubbard placed three retired priests on administrative leave and removed another from the ministry after receiving allegations of child sexual abuse. Hubbard apologized in 2013 for shortcomings by him and the diocese in responding to the sexual abuse crisis.

In a July 2021 interview with the Albany Times Union, Hubbard admitted that the diocese used to send priests accused of sexually abusing minor away for treatment without notifying the police. He expressed regret over this practice.

In a 2021 deposition, Hubbard acknowledged under oath that he had covered up allegations of sexual abuse against children by priests during his tenure as bishop. He testified that one of the reasons for the coverups was to avoid scandal and protect the reputation of the diocese. Hubbard named several accused priests who were returned to ministry after treatment without notification to the public. When asked why he had not contacted law enforcement to report allegations of child sex abuse, he testified that he understood that he was not required to do so.

== Retirement, marriage, and death ==
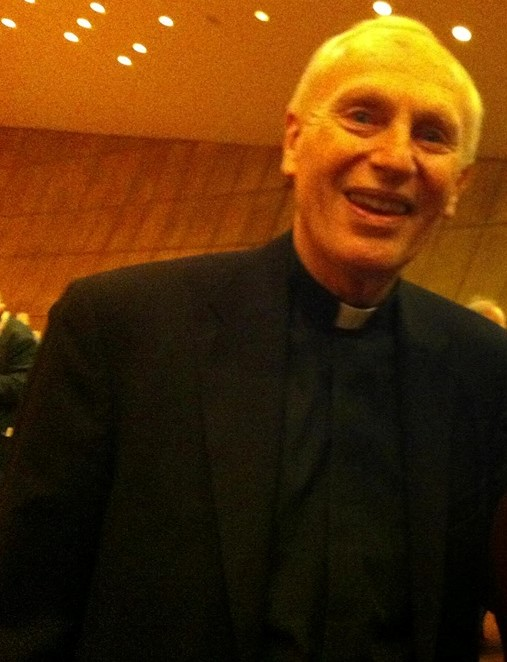
Hubbard at his retirement party in 2014

Hubbard submitted his required letter of resignation to Pope Francis on October 31, 2013, when he reached the age of 75. On February 11, 2014, the Vatican announced that the Pope had accepted Hubbard's resignation and appointed Bishop Edward Scharfenberger as his successor. Following his retirement, he was known as bishop emeritus of the Albany diocese.

In 2019, Hubbard announced that he was taking a voluntary leave of absence from public ministry until a clergy abuse claim against him was resolved.

Hubbard suffered a heart attack in July 2015 and a stroke in July 2022.

In November 2022, Hubbard petitioned the Vatican to laicize him, explaining that he was already unable to function as a priest due to the diocese's policy of barring any clergy with active investigations from public ministry. The diocese said that was not their policy and that Hubbard had removed himself from active ministry.

In July 2023, at age 84, Hubbard married a woman in a civil ceremony. Bishop Scharfenberger stated that the Catholic Church did not recognize the marriage because the Vatican had not granted Hubbard's request for laicization.

A month after he was married, Hubbard suffered another stroke and was hospitalized. He died in Albany on August 19, 2023 at age 84. He was survived by his widow, Jennifer Barrie Hubbard, and by 13 nieces and nephews.

Catholic Church titles
Preceded by Edwin Broderick	Bishop of Albany; 1977–2014	Succeeded by Edward Bernard Scharfenberger
