= William Scully (bishop) =

American prelate

His Excellency, The Most Reverend William Scully
- Bishop of Albany; Titular Bishop of Pharsalus
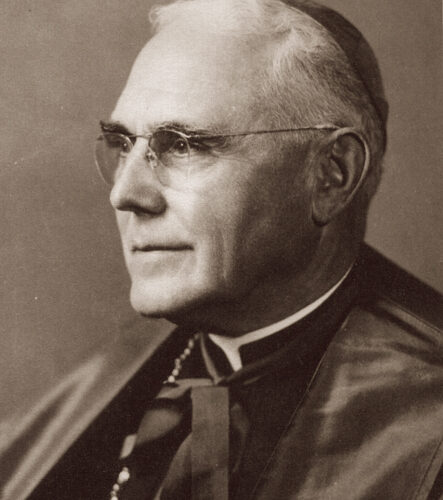
- Province: New York
- Diocese: Albany
- Installed: 1945
- Term ended: 1969
- Predecessor: Edmund Gibbons
- Successor: Edwin Broderick
- Other post: Titular Bishop of Pharsalus
- Previous post: Coadjutor Bishop of Albany (1945 to 1954)

Orders
- Ordination: September 20, 1919 by Patrick Joseph Hayes
- Consecration: October 24, 1945 by Edmund Gibbons

Personal details
- Born: August 6, 1894 New York City, US
- Died: January 5, 1969 (aged 74) Albany, New York, US
- Denomination: Roman Catholic Church
- Education: St. Joseph's Seminary; Catholic University of America
- Motto: Tibi servire regnare (To serve you and reign)

William Aloysius Scully (August 6, 1894 – January 5, 1969) was an American prelate of the Roman Catholic Church. He served as bishop of Albany in New York State from 1954 until his death in 1969. He previously served as coadjutor bishop of Albany from 1945 to 1954.

== Biography ==
=== Early life ===
William Scully was born on August 6, 1894, in New York City. He attended Cathedral College in New York City and St. Joseph's Seminary in Yonkers, New York. He also studied at the Catholic University of America in Washington, D.C.

=== Priesthood ===
Scully was ordained to the priesthood for the Archdiocese of New York on September 20, 1919, in New York City by Cardinal Patrick Joseph Hayes. After his ordination, the archdiocese assigned Scully as a curate and afterwards pastor at Sacred Heart of Jesus Parish in Manhattan. He later became pastor of that parish. Cardinal Francis Spellman appointed Scully as secretary of education for the archdiocese in 1940. The Vatican elevated Scully to the rank of domestic prelate in 1941.

=== Coadjutor Bishop and Bishop of Albany ===
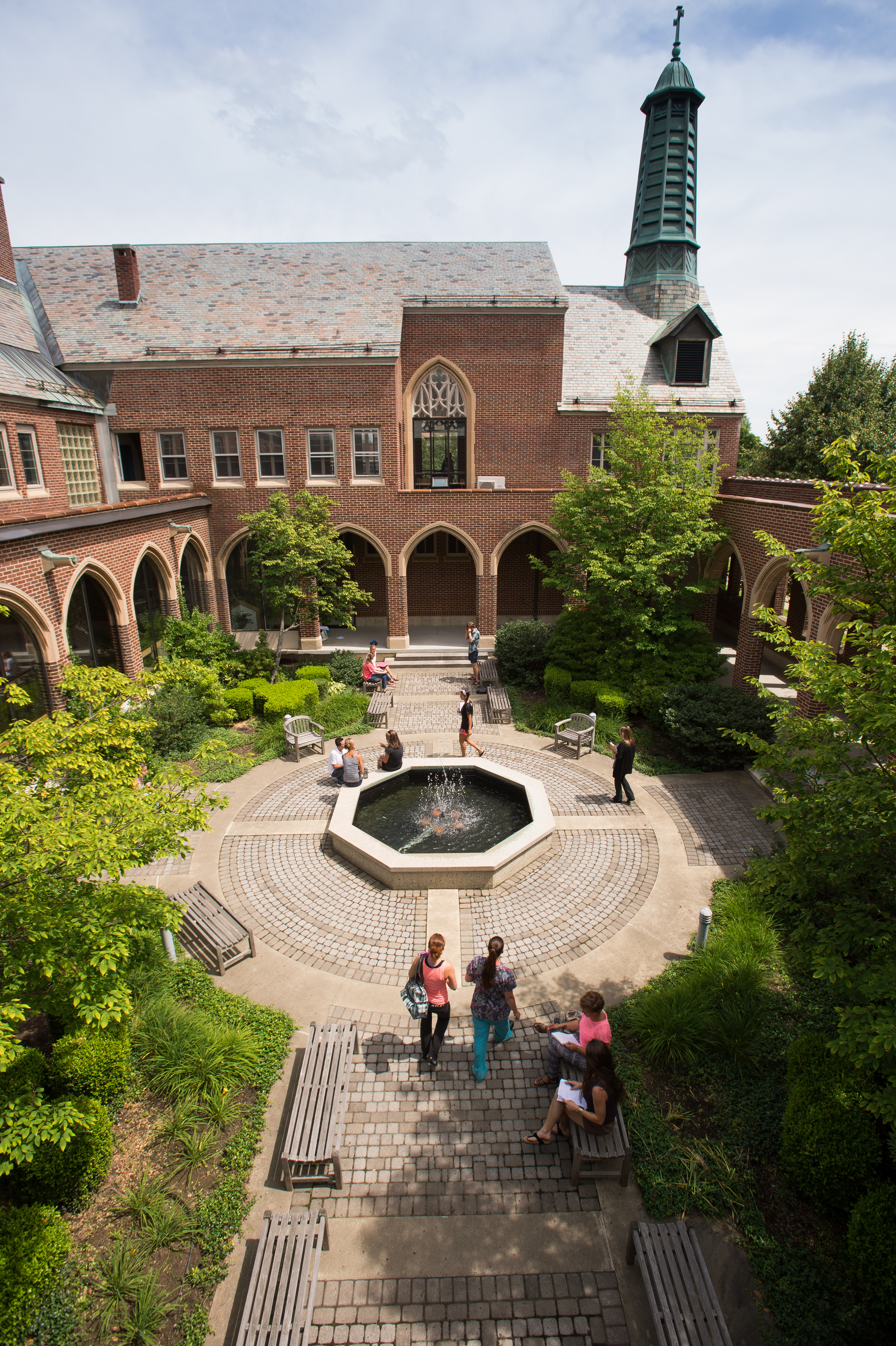
Maria College, Albany, New York (2014)

On August 21, 1945, Scully was appointed coadjutor bishop of Albany and titular bishop of Pharsalus by Pope Pius XII to assist . He received his episcopal consecration on October 24, 1945, from Bishop Edmund Gibbons, with Bishops Thomas Edmund Molloy and Bryan Joseph McEntegart serving as co-consecrators and assigned him as pastor to St. Mary's Parish in Troy for nine years.

Following Gibbon's resignation as bishop of Albany, Scully succeeded him on November 10, 1954. In 1955, he founded an annual appeal for funds to support diocesan education and welfare programs. He established a total of thirteen parishes, twenty-one elementary schools, six high schools and expanded two others, a nursing home, and Maria College in Albany. He also headed the New York State Catholic Welfare Committee and the Catholic Charities division of the National Catholic Welfare Council.

In 1963, Sculley was forced to return to Albany from the Second Vatican Council in Rome due to fatigue. He delegated the active administration of the diocese to an auxiliary bishop in 1966.

=== Death and legacy ===
Scully died on January 5, 1969, from bronchial pneumonia at St. Peter's Hospital in Albany, at age 74. Governor Nelson Rockefeller described his death as "a grievous loss—not only to those of his faith but to all of us in New York State."

Catholic Church titles
Preceded by Edmund Gibbons	Bishop of Albany; 1954—1969	Succeeded by Edwin Broderick
