= Edwin Broderick =

American Catholic priest (1917-2006)

His Excellency, The Most Reverend Edwin Bernard Broderick
- Bishop of Albany; Titular Bishop of Thizica
- Province: New York
- Diocese: Albany
- Installed: March 19, 1969
- Term ended: June 3, 1976
- Predecessor: William Scully
- Successor: Howard James Hubbard
- Other post: Executive Director of Catholic Relief Services (1976 to 1983)
- Previous post: Auxiliary Bishop of New York (1967-69)

Orders
- Ordination: May 30, 1942 by Francis Spellman
- Consecration: March 8, 1967 by Francis Spellman

Personal details
- Born: January 16, 1917 Bronx, New York, US
- Died: July 2, 2006 (aged 89) Albany, New York, US
- Denomination: Roman Catholic Church
- Education: St. Joseph's Seminary; Fordham University
- Motto: Abide with us, oh Lord

Ordination history of Edwin Broderick
History
Episcopal consecration
- Consecrated by: Francis Spellman
Episcopal succession
Bishops consecrated by Edwin Broderick as principal consecrator
- Edward Dennis Head: January 27, 1970
- Patrick Vincent Ahern: March 19, 1970
- Ronald Gerard Connors: July 20, 1976
- Howard James Hubbard: March 27, 1977

Edwin Bernard Broderick (January 16, 1917 – July 2, 2006) was an American prelate of the Roman Catholic Church. He served as bishop of the Diocese of Albany in New York from 1969 to 1976.

Broderick previously served as an auxiliary bishop of the Archdiocese of New York from 1967 to 1969. From 1976 to 1983, he served as executive director of Catholic Relief Services.

== Early life and education ==
Edwin Broderick was born on January 16, 1917, in the Bronx, New York, to Patrick S. and Margaret M. (née O'Donnell) Broderick. His father was a member of the New York City Fire Department who died in 1948 during a mass celebrated by his son. Broderick received his early education at the parochial school of St. Anselm Church in the Bronx, graduating in 1930.

Broderick attended Regis High School in New York City from 1930 to 1934, then began his studies for the priesthood at Cathedral College in Queens, where he remained for two years. He continued his studies at St. Joseph's Seminary in Yonkers, New York.

== Priesthood ==
On May 30, 1942, Broderick was ordained a priest for the Archdiocese of New York by Archbishop Francis Spellman at St. Patrick's Cathedral in Manhattan After his ordination, the archdiocese assigned him as a curate at Nativity of Our Blessed Lady Parish in the Bronx. He also taught history at Cardinal Hayes High School in the Bronx. The archdiocese in 1947 reassigned Broderick to the staff at St. Patrick's Cathedral.

In 1951, Broderick earned a doctorate in English from Fordham University in the Bronx. That same year, he was named the first archdiocesan director of radio and television; during his tenure he created the Catholic Apostolate of Radio, TV and Advertising. He was appointed as the American representative to the Pontifical Commission for Television by Pope Pius XII in 1954.

From 1954 to 1964, Broderick served as secretary to Spellman. He served in this capacity, together with Reverend Patrick Ahern, for several years. He was named rector of St. Joseph's Seminary in 1964.

== Auxiliary Bishop of New York ==
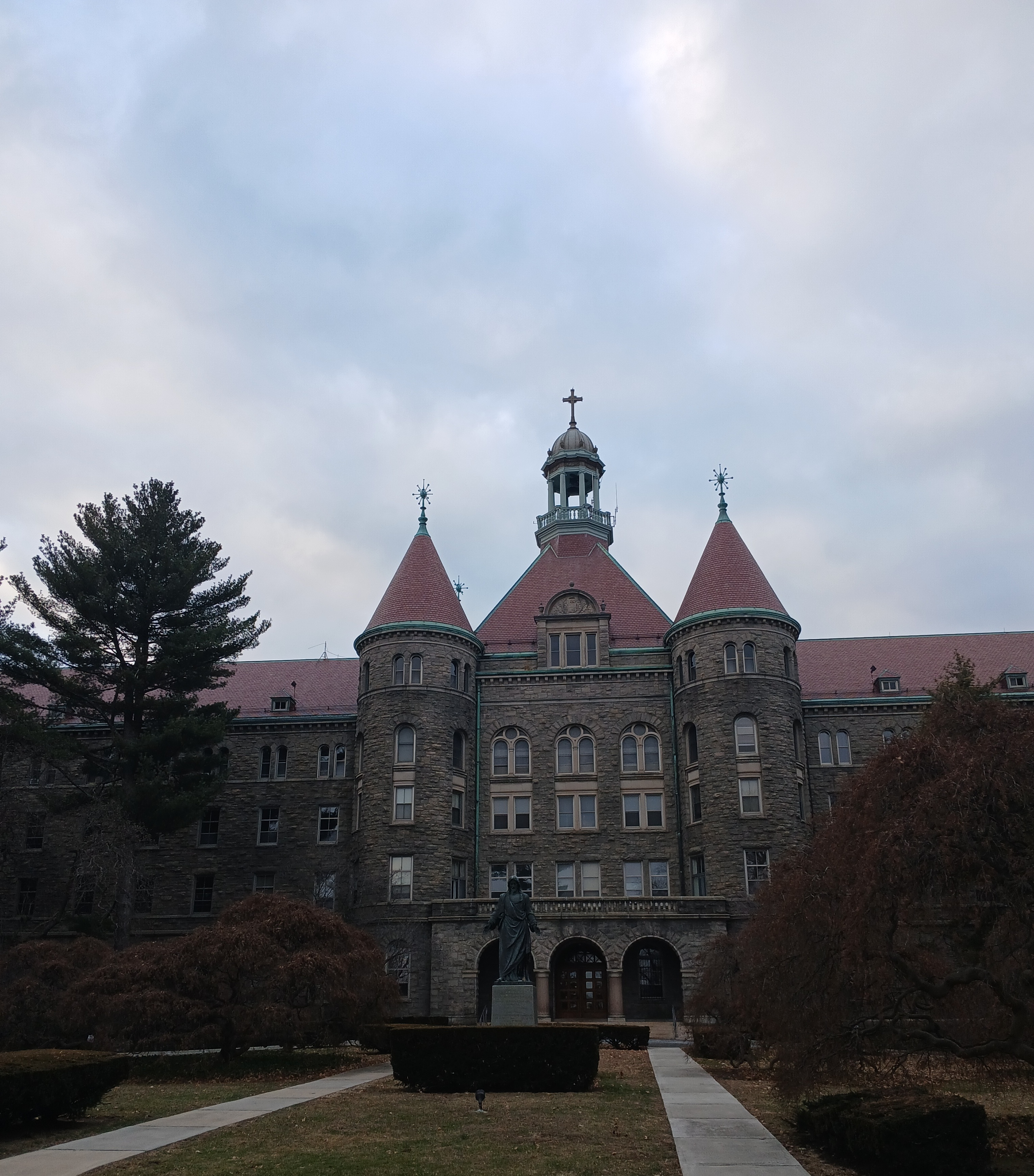
St. Joseph Seminary, Yonkers, New York (2025)

On March 8, 1967, Broderick was appointed auxiliary bishop of New York and titular bishop of Thizica by Pope Paul VI. He received his episcopal consecration on April 21, 1967. from Spellman, with Bishops Terence Cooke and George Henry Guilfoyle serving as co-consecrators, at St. Patrick's Cathedral.

At his consecration, Broderick wore the same vestments used by Paul VI during his 1965 mass at Yankee Stadium in New York City. As an auxiliary bishop, Broderick continued to serve as rector of St. Joseph's Seminary.

== Bishop of Albany ==
Broderick was appointed the eighth bishop of Albany by Paul VI on March 19, 1969. In 1970, he joined New York Governor Nelson Rockefeller in supporting state aid to parochial schools. Broderick served on the court-appointed Citizens' Committee that investigated the handling of the 1971 Attica Prison riot in Attica, New York.

== Executive Director of Catholic Relief Services ==
On June 3, 1976, Broderick resigned as bishop of Albany to become executive director of Catholic Relief Services (CRS) in Baltimore, Maryland. When he became head of CRS, he jokingly called the agency "the best kept secret in the American Catholic Church." He increased awareness of CRS throughout the American Catholic community; he sponsored short films and new publications. Broderick also stage telethons that were hosted by the entertainer Arthur Godfrey, the comedian Buddy Hackett and the singer Trini Lopez. He also established the agency's first direct mail appeal to donors.

During his seven-year tenure at CRS, Broderick restructured its governance of and increased the involvement of the laity in its operations. He also launched Operation Rice Bowl, one of the most successful programs in CRS history. Under his guidance, CRS responded to numerous crises including the 1976 Angolan Civil War, the 1977 cyclone in India, the Khmer Rouge genocide in Cambodia of the 1970s, the Afghan war and the Lebanese Civil War. He resigned as executive director of CRS in 1983.

== Later life and death ==
Broderick spent his retirement in Manhattan and administered confirmations in many parishes. In 2005, he moved to Teresian House in Albany, where he died on July 2, 2006, at age 89.

Catholic Church titles
Preceded by –	Catholic Relief Services Executive Director; 1976–1983	Succeeded by –
Preceded by William Scully	Bishop of Albany; 1969–1976	Succeeded by Howard J. Hubbard
Preceded by –	Auxiliary Bishop of New York; 1967–1969	Succeeded by –
