= Brad Myers (guitarist) =

- Born: December 25, 1975
- Genres: Jazz
- Occupation(s): Guitarist, Composer
- Instrument(s): Guitar, Mandolin, Bass guitar
- Years active: 1996–present
- Website: musicbybrad.com

Brad Myers (born December 25, 1975) is an American jazz composer and guitarist.

== Biography ==
Myers started playing music at the age of 6. While first studying the piano, he switched to guitar at the age of 10. Then inspired by The Beatles, Jimi Hendrix, Yes, Rush and the Allman Brothers, his interest switched to jazz. Later inspirations for Myers include Jim Hall, the Bill Evans Trio, Keith Jarrett, Metheny and John Scofield.

Until 1994, Myers lived in the Washington D.C. area. In 1994 he moved to Cincinnati, Ohio, to study jazz guitar with James E. Smith at the University of Cincinnati – College-Conservatory of Music (CCM) on an Honors Scholarship. He returned to CCM in 2013 to pursue his formal studies; he received his master's degree in Jazz Studies in 2015.

== Career ==
In 1998, while studying at the CCM, Myers made his first recordings, as featured soloist on the album Lady Bird by the Two O'Clock Combo (directed by Pat Harbison) and the CCM Jazz Ensemble (directed by Rick VanMatre). In the same year, Myers joined Ray's Music Exchange, a Cincinnati-based funk jazz outfit known for long energetic improvisational grooves. Ray's Music Exchange was inspired by artists like Miles Davis’ electric bands, Frank Zappa, Medeski, Martin & Wood, The Meters and John Zorn. Myers toured the US with Ray's Music Exchange from 1998 till 2006 and produced five full-length recordings with them. In 2010, when the group reunited, Myers produced their live DVD A Live Rayunion.

During his career, Myers shared the stage with artists like John Scofield, Stanley Jordan, Victor Wooten, Béla Fleck, Brian Charette and the Cincinnati Pops Orchestra. He also is a member of several ensembles, either as a guitarist and/or co-director, including The Midwestern Swing, The David McDonnell Group, The Fraid Knots (with Jacklyn Chitwood), and Aja - Steely Dan Tribute. Since 2010, Myers is a member of Steve Schmidt's Organ Trio based in Cincinnati.

In April 2012, Myers played the role of Jim (vocals, guitar, mandolin) in Pump Boys and Dinettes at The Carnegie Theater. In the same year, Myers was a featured guest soloist playing the part of Cal Collins in Nancy James and Carmen DeLeone's A Salute to Rosemary Clooney.

Myers debuted as a leader on the 2015 album Prime Numbers. The album received positive reviews from critics, including a 4 star review from jazz magazine Down Beat.

In 2017, Myers released an album with bassist Michael Sharfe, Sanguinaria (Hopefulsongs).

== Select discography ==
Year	Album	Credits / Notes
2017	Sanguinaria (Hopefulsongs)	Producer, composer, guitarist. With Michael Sharfe.
2016	In Search of Garaj Mahal	Guitarist. Performed by CCM Jazz Orchestra with Fareed Haque.
2015	Prime Numbers	Producer, composer, guitarist. Arranged and performed by the Brad Myers Quintet (Brad Myers, Chris Barrick, Ben Walkenhauer, Peter Gemus, Tom Buckley).
2015	I Come Into This World	Guitarist (acoustic and electric). Written by David Kisor and Andrea Cefalo.
2014	OH/KY	Guitarist. Album by Jeremy Pinnell & the 55's.
2014	Dandelion	Guitarist. Produced by David Kisor.
2013	Straight Up Swingin’	Guitarist (guest soloist). Album by Trio Pi (Michael Sharfe, Rob Allgeyer, Jim Leslie)
2011	A Live Rayunion (DVD)	Co-leader, guitarist, producer. Live concert video: Ray's Music Exchange performing at their first reunion show in 2010 at Play By Play Cafe in Cincinnati.
2010	Live at the Blue Wisp	Guitarist. Live album by Brian Batchelor-Glader's quartet.
2007	How They Look To The Skies	Co-producer, engineer. Album by The Swarthy Band.
2004	Blue in the face	Producer, composer, guitarist. Album by Ray's Music Exchange.
2003	Ray’s Reels Vol. 2	Producer, composer, guitarist. Live album by Ray's Music Exchange.
2002	Ray’s Reels Vol. 1	Producer, composer, guitarist. Live album by Ray's Music Exchange.
2001	Turanga	Producer, composer, guitarist. Album by Ray's Music Exchange.
1999	Alivexchange	Producer, composer, guitarist. Live album by Ray's Music Exchange.
1998	Lady Bird	Guitarist (featured soloist). Album by CCM Jazz Ensemble (directed by Rick VanMatre) and 2:00 Jazz Combo (directed by Pat Harbison), produced by Rick VanMatre.
