= 2019 Canadian honours =

Canadian government recognitions

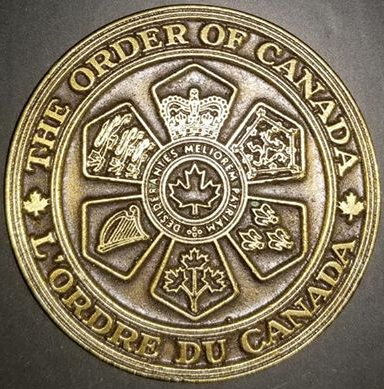
The Seal of the Order of Canada

The following are the appointments to various Canadian Honours of 2019. Usually, they are announced as part of the New Year and Canada Day celebrations and are published within the Canada Gazette during year. This follows the custom set out within the United Kingdom which publishes its appoints of various British Honours for New Year's and for monarch's official birthday. However, instead of the midyear appointments announced on Victoria Day, the official birthday of the Canadian Monarch, this custom has been transferred with the celebration of Canadian Confederation and the creation of the Order of Canada.

However, as the Canada Gazette publishes appointment to various orders, decorations and medal, either Canadian or from Commonwealth and foreign states, this article will reference all Canadians so honoured during the 2019 calendar year.

Provincial Honours are not listed within the Canada Gazette, however they are listed within the various publications of each provincial government. Provincial honours are listed within the page.

== The Order of Canada ==
=== Companions of the Order of Canada ===
Undress ribbon of a Companion of the Order of Canada

- James Arthur, C.C.
- Geoffrey E. Hinton, C.C.
- Iain Baxter, C.C., O.Ont., O.B.C. - This is a promotion within the Order
- Robert Phelan Langlands, C.C.
- Alanis Obomsawin, C.C., G.O.Q. - This is a promotion within the Order
- Buffy Sainte-Marie, C.C. - This is a promotion within the Order
- Donald McNichol Sutherland, C.C. - This is a promotion within the Order
- James Francis Cameron, C.C.
- Raymond A. J. Chrétien, C.C. - This is a promotion within the Order
- George A. Cohon, C.C., O.Ont. - This is a promotion within the Order
- The Right Honourable Stephen Joseph Harper, P.C., C.C.
- Donna Theo Strickland, C.C.

=== Honorary Officer of the Order of Canada ===
Undress ribbon of an Officer of the Order of Canada

- Marie Ann Battiste, O.C.

=== Officers of the Order of Canada ===
- Jo-ann Archibald Q’um Q’um Xiiem, O.C.
- Vernon Douglas Burrows, O.C. - This is a promotion within the Order
- Leonard Joseph Cariou, O.C., O.M.
- Levente László Diosady, O.C., O.Ont.
- Digvir Jayas, O.C.
- Suzanne Lacasse, O.C.
- Robert Lacroix, O.C., O.Q. - This is a promotion within the Order
- Daniel Lamarre, O.C.
- Leroy Little Bear, O.C., A.O.E.
- Ann-Marie MacDonald, O.C.
- Christopher Newton, O.C. - This is a promotion within the Order
- Jean Pelletier, O.C.
- Rebecca Scott, O.C., M.S.M.
- Robert Tessier, O.C.
- Richard Ernest Tremblay, O.C.
- Ric Esther Bienstock, O.C.
- Ronnie Burkett, O.C.
- Elizabeth Cannon, O.C.
- Gordon R. Diamond, O.C., O.B.C.
- John England, O.C.
- Graham Fraser, O.C.
- Rémy Girard, O.C.
- Eldon C. Godfrey, O.C.
- Dame Moya Marguerite Greene, D.B.E., O.C.
- Lisa LaFlamme, O.C., O.Ont.
- Marion Lewis, O.C.
- James A. O’Reilly, O.C.
- Arthur J. Ray, O.C.
- Lotfollah Shafai, O.C.
- Martin Hayter Short, O.C. - This is a promotion within the Order
- Peter Suedfeld, O.C.
- Brian Sykes, O.C.
- William G. Tholl, O.C.
- Harvey D. Voldeng, O.C.
- Ian E. Wilson, O.C. - This is a promotion within the Order
- John Amagoalik, O.C., O.Nu.
- Annette av Paul, O.C.
- Raymond Bachand, O.C.
- David Osborn Braley, O.C.
- Eddy Carmack, O.C.
- John J. Clague, O.C.
- Slava Corn, O.C.
- Jean-Charles Coutu, O.C., O.Q.
- Donald B. Dingwell, O.C.
- Michael Donovan, O.C.
- Alain-G. Gagnon, O.C.
- The Honourable Daniel P. Hays, P.C., O.C., C.D.
- Mark Henkelman, O.C.
- Joan May Hollobon, O.C.
- Daniel Jutras, O.C.
- Shoo Kim Lee, O.C.
- Thomas E. H. Lee, O.C.
- Noni MacDonald, O.C., O.N.S.
- Robie W. Macdonald, O.C.
- Robin McLeod, O.C.
- André Ménard, O.C.
- Karen Messing, O.C.
- Christine M. Morrissey, O.C.
- Sister Sue M. Mosteller, O.C.
- Donald Kenneth Newman, O.C.- This is a promotion within the Order
- Caroline Ouellette, O.C.
- François Paulette, O.C.
- Debra Pepler, O.C.
- Heather Maxine Reisman, O.C.- This is a promotion within the Order
- Cheryl Rockman-Greenberg, O.C., O.M.
- Marcel Sabourin, O.C.
- James V. Scott, O.C.
- Alain Simard, O.C., C.Q.
- Gilles Ste-Croix, O.C.
- Josef Svoboda, O.C.
- Lorna Wanósts'a7 Williams, O.C., O.B.C.
- James V. Zidek, O.C.
- Bernard Zinman, O.C. - This is a promotion within the Order

=== Honorary Members of the Order of Canada ===
Undress ribbon for a Member of the Order of Canada

- Kathleen Reichs, C.M.
- Richard J. Schmeelk, C.M., C.Q.

=== Members of the Order of Canada ===
- Eva Aariak, C.M.
- Brent Belzberg, C.M.
- Hélène Boisjoly, C.M.
- Barbara M. Bowlby, C.M.
- Doneta A. P. Brotchie, C.M.
- Shelley Ann Marie Brown, C.M
- John M. Brunton, C.M.
- Shirley Cheechoo, C.M.
- Robert Crosbie, C.M.
- Joanne Cuthbertson, C.M.
- Kevin J. Dancey, C.M.
- Michel de la Chenelière, C.M., C.Q.
- Raymond L. Desjardins, C.M.
- Thomas Dignan, C.M., O.Ont.
- Ian Robert Dohoo, C.M.
- Lyse Doucet, C.M., O.B.E.
- Micheline Dumont, C.M.
- Jean André Élie, C.M.
- Darren Entwistle, C.M.
- Ann McCain Evans, C.M.
- Roxanne Fairweather, C.M., O.N.B.
- Ross D. Feldman, C.M.
- Charles Edgar Fipke, C.M.
- Charles Fischer, C.M.
- Léopold L. Foulem, C.M.
- Ron Foxcroft, C.M.
- The Honourable John Ferguson Godfrey, P.C., C.M.
- Georges Henri Goguen, C.M.
- Blake Charles Goldring, C.M., M.S.M, C.D.
- Serge Gouin, C.M.
- Jean Grand-Maître, C.M.
- Daniel Granger, C.M.
- Gordon Cecil Gray, C.M., O.Ont.
- Arshavir Gundjian, C.M.
- Alfred Halasa, C.M.
- Linda Hasenfratz, C.M.
- Jay Hennick, C.M.
- Michael Higgins, C.M.
- Paul John Higgins, C.M.
- Robert Hindmarch, C.M., O.B.C.
- Robert Hung-Ngai Ho, C.M., O.B.C.
- John Kirk Howard, C.M.
- Austin Hillard Hunt, C.M.
- Barbara Jackman, C.M.
- Christina Jennings, C.M.
- Alexandra F. Johnston, C.M.
- Bengt Jörgen, C.M.
- Roger Kerans, C.M.
- Robert Korneluk, C.M.
- Mary R. L’Abbé, C.M.
- Gilbert Laporte, C.M.
- Donald Gordon Lawson, C.M.
- Daniel Lessard, C.M.
- The Honourable H. Frank Lewis, C.M., O.P.E.I.
- James Lockyer, C.M.
- Gloria Macarenko, C.M.
- John McEwen, C.M.
- Jefferson Mooney, C.M.
- Raymond Alexander Muzyka, C.M.
- Maxine Noel, C.M.
- Francis Pang, C.M.
- Kathleen Pearson, C.M.
- Isabelle Peretz, C.M., O.Q.
- Andrew Petter, C.M.
- Marshall S. Pynkoski, C.M.
- Imant Karlis Raminsh, C.M.
- Dominique Rankin, C.M., C.Q.
- John Rea, C.M.
- Michèle Rivet, C.M.
- Henri-Paul Rousseau, C.M.
- Claudine Roy, C.M., C.Q.
- Louis Sabourin, C.M., C.Q.
- André Simard, C.M.
- Peter D. Simons, C.M., C.Q.
- Pekka Sinervo, C.M.
- Arthur Slutsky, C.M.
- Heather Stuart, C.M.
- Camille Henri Thériault, C.M.
- Charles Maral Tisseyre, C.M.
- Denis Vaugeois, C.M., O.Q.
- Elisabeth Walker-Young, C.M.
- Rhoda Wurtele Eaves, C.M.
- Rhona Wurtele Gillis, C.M.
- Gregory Zeschuk, C.M.
- Jeannette Regula Lajeunesse Zingg, C.M.
- Renée April, C.M.
- Luigi Aquilini, C.M., O.B.C.
- Renaldo Battista, C.M.
- W. J. Brad Bennett, C.M., O.B.C.
- Susan Benson, C.M.
- Louise Bradley, C.M.
- Joseph Raymond Buncic, C.M.
- Robert L. Carroll, C.M.
- Raymond J. Cole, C.M.
- Patrick Ralph Crawford, C.M.
- Aubrey Dan, C.M.
- Fernand Dansereau, C.M.
- Tom Ralston Denton, C.M., O.M., C.D.
- Claire Deschênes, C.M.
- Sara Diamond, C.M., O.Ont.
- Michel Dumont, C.M., O.Q.
- Edna Ekhivalak Elias, C.M., O.Nu.
- Mitch Garber, C.M.
- H. Roger Garland, C.M.
- Frank Giustra, C.M.
- Mark Byron Godden, C.M.
- Chan Hon Goh, C.M.
- Jean-Paul Grappe, C.M., C.Q.
- V. Tony Hauser, C.M.
- Eric Garth Hudson, C.M.
- Andy Jones, C.M.
- Gertrude Kearns, C.M.
- Perry R. W. Kendall, C.M., O.B.C.
- Keith I. Knott, C.M.
- Paul C. LaBarge, C.M.
- Suzanne Labarge, C.M.
- Reginald Leach, C.M., O.M.
- Walter J. Learning, C.M., O.N.B.
- Keith MacPhail, C.M.
- Bennett McCarty, C.M.
- David McLean, C.M.
- The Honourable Joseph Robert Nuss, C.M., Q.C.
- C. Michael O’Brian, C.M.
- Hanna Maria Pappius, C.M.
- Linda Rabin, C.M.
- Claude Raymond, C.M.
- Chaim M. Roifman, C.M.
- Nick Saul, C.M.
- Donald R. M. Schmitt, C.M.
- Brenda Harris Singer, C.M.
- Donna M. Slaight, C.M.
- John Warren Sleeman, C.M.
- A. Britton Smith, C.M.
- Dorothy E. Smith, C.M.
- Michael Dixon Smith, C.M.
- Howard Timothy Lee Soon, C.M.
- J. David Spence, C.M.
- Matthew Teitelbaum, C.M.
- James W. Treliving, C.M.
- The Honourable Allan H. Wachowich, C.M., A.O.E., Q.C.
- John Wade, C.M.
- The Honourable Karen Merle Weiler, C.M.
- Pita Aatami, C.M., C.Q.
- Brian Ahern, C.M.
- Mathew Baldwin, C.M.
- T. Robert Beamish, C.M.
- Ronald Duncan Besse, C.M.
- Paul Born, C.M.
- Maurice Brisson, C.M.
- Omer Chouinard, C.M.
- Diane Clement, C.M.
- Mitchell Cohen, C.M.
- John Collins, C.M.
- The Honourable James Cowan, C.M., Q.C.
- Phillip Crawley, C.M., C.B.E.
- Valerie Lynn Creighton, C.M., S.O.M.
- Anne Innis Dagg, C.M.
- Mary Eberle Deacon, C.M.
- The Reverend Dr. Cheri DiNovo, C.M.
- Xavier Dolan, C.M., C.Q.
- Hugo Eppich, C.M.
- Wayne John Fairhead, C.M.
- Ronald Charles Fellows, C.M.
- Thomas J. Foran, C.M., O.N.L.
- Eric D. Friesen, C.M.
- Berna Valencia Garron, C.M.
- Myron Austin Garron, C.M.
- Hana Gartner, C.M.
- Marie Giguère, C.M.
- Katherine Govier, C.M.
- Brigadier-General the Honourable John James Grant, C.M., C.M.M., O.N.S., C.D.
- Ken Greenberg, C.M.
- Roger D. Grimes, C.M.
- Arshavir Gundjian, C.M.
- Sarah Hall, C.M.
- Pavel Hamet, C.M., O.Q.
- Peter Harrison, C.M.
- Joyce Louise Hisey, C.M.
- Gordon J. Hoffman, C.M., Q.C.
- Steve E. Hrudey, C.M., A.O.E.
- John S. Hunkin, C.M.
- Johnny Nurraq Seotaituq Issaluk, C.M.
- Peter Kendall, C.M.
- Hal Philip Klepak, C.M., C.D.
- alcides lanza, C.M.
- Cathy Levy, C.M.
- Wendy Lisogar-Cocchia, C.M., O.B.C.
- Derek Lister, C.M.
- Julie Macfarlane, C.M.
- Isabelle Marcoux, C.M.
- R. Mohan Mathur, C.M.
- Donald S. Mavinic, C.M.
- Denyse McCann, C.M.
- Séan McCann, C.M.
- Brian Theodore McGeer, C.M.
- Stuart M. McGill, C.M.
- Anthony Bernard Miller, C.M.
- Nadir H. Mohamed, C.M.
- Susan Helena Mortimer, C.M.
- M. Lee Myers, C.M.
- Paul Nicklen, C.M.
- The Honourable Donald H. Oliver, C.M., Q.C.
- Brian Stuart Osborne, C.M.
- Louis-Frédéric Paquin, C.M.
- Ralph Pentland, C.M.
- Michael U. Potter, C.M.
- Robert Dick Richmond, C.M.
- Larry Rosen, C.M.
- Janice Sanderson, C.M.
- Kourken Sarkissian, C.M.
- Duncan Gordon Sinclair, C.M.
- Harry Sheldon Swain, C.M.
- Beverly Thomson, C.M.
- Darren Dennis Throop, C.M.
- Jennifer Tory, C.M.
- Gordon W. Walker, C.M., Q.C.
- Mel Watkins, C.M.
- Sheri-D Wilson, C.M.
- Lynn Margaret Zimmer, C.M.

== Order of Military Merit ==
=== Commanders of the Order of Military Merit ===
Undress ribbon for a Commander of the Order of Military Merit

- Major-General Frances Jennifer Allen, C.M.M., C.D. - This is a promotion within the Order.
- Major-General Christian Drouin, C.M.M., M.S.C., C.D. - This is a promotion within the Order.
- Lieutenant-General Wayne Donald Eyre, C.M.M., M.S.C., C.D.
- Rear-Admiral Arthur Gerard McDonald, C.M.M., M.S.M., C.D.
- Major-General Carl Jean Turenne, C.M.M., M.S.C., C.D. - This is a promotion within the Order.

=== Officers of the Order of Military Merit ===
Undress ribbon for an Officer of the Order of Military Merit

- Colonel John Joseph Alexander, O.M.M., M.S.M., C.D.
- Commodore Geneviève Bernatchez, O.M.M., C.D.
- Colonel Joseph Raoul Stéphane Boivin, O.M.M., M.S.C., C.D.
- Brigadier-General Marie Hélène Lise Bourgon, O.M.M., M.S.C., C.D.
- Colonel Pierre Frédéric André Demers, O.M.M., M.S.C., C.D.
- Brigadier-General Andrew Michael Downes, O.M.M., C.D.
- Lieutenant-Commander Valérie Bernadette Finney, O.M.M., C.D.
- Colonel William Hilton Fletcher, O.M.M., S.M.V., C.D.
- Captain(N) Michael Andrew Hopper, O.M.M., C.D.
- Major Jameel Jawaid Janjua, O.M.M., C.D.
- Colonel Jay Howard Janzen, O.M.M., C.D.
- Brigadier-General Stephen Richardson Kelsey, O.M.M., C.D.
- Lieutenant-Colonel Catherine Jocelyne Marchetti, O.M.M., C.D.
- Colonel Christopher Alan McKenna, O.M.M., M.S.M., C.D.
- Colonel Jean Georges René Melançon, O.M.M., C.D.
- Lieutenant-Colonel Kevin Reinhold Morton, O.M.M., M.S.M., C.D.
- Lieutenant-Colonel Kristopher Robert Purdy, O.M.M., C.D.
- Colonel Roger Leigh Scott, O.M.M., C.D.
- Brigadier-General Nicolas Stanton, O.M.M., C.D.
- Lieutenant-Colonel Eleanor Frances Taylor, O.M.M., M.S.M., C.D.
- Commander Michele Tessier, O.M.M., C.D.

=== Members of the Order of Military Merit ===
Undress ribbon for a Member of the Order of Military Merit

- Warrant Officer Charles Ansell, M.M.M., C.D.
- Warrant Officer Jason Eric Armstrong, M.M.M., C.D.
- Master Warrant Officer Hugo Serge Asselin, M.M.M., C.D.
- Master Warrant Officer James Matthew Aucoin, M.M.M., C.D.
- Chief Warrant Officer Bruce Edward Ball, M.M.M., C.D.
- Master Warrant Officer Maryse Marie Monique Bélisle, M.M.M., C.D.
- Captain Guy Beriau, M.M.M., C.D.
- Chief Warrant Officer Jean Gérard Éric Bouffard, M.M.M., C.D.
- Chief Warrant Officer Maurice George Campbell, M.M.M., C.D.
- Chief Petty Officer 1st Class Daniel Eugene Campbell, M.M.M., C.D.
- Chief Warrant Officer Joseph Stéphane Martin Cartier, M.M.M., C.D.
- Master Warrant Officer Darryl John Cattell, M.M.M., C.D.
- Captain Blair Ainlie Christie, M.M.M., C.D.
- Warrant Officer Steven Alan Corcoran, M.M.M., C.D.
- Master Warrant Officer Joseph Noël Patrick Crépeau, M.M.M., C.D.
- Captain Brougham August Robert Deegan, M.M.M., C.D.
- Master Warrant Officer Joseph Olivier Richard Descheneaux, M.M.M., C.D.
- Warrant Officer Joseph Steve Desgagné, M.M.M., M.B., C.D.
- Master Corporal Mohammed Diabei-Irani, M.M.M., M.S.M., C.D.
- Sergeant Dustin Donovan, M.M.M., C.D.
- Master Warrant Officer Robert Allen Englehart, M.M.M., C.D.
- Chief Warrant Officer Joseph Jacques Friolet, M.M.M., M.S.M., C.D.
- Warrant Officer Frédéric Joseph André Gagnon, M.M.M., C.D.
- Warrant Officer Anthony Stephen Gilmore, M.M.M., C.D.
- Chief Petty Officer 2nd Class Matthew James Goodwin, M.M.M., C.D.
- Warrant Officer Charles William Howieson Graham, M.M.M., C.D.
- Master Warrant Officer Nancy Maryse Yolande Guay, M.M.M., C.D.
- Chief Warrant Officer Robert Hains, M.M.M., C.D.
- Master Warrant Officer Joseph Sabin Serge Harvey, M.M.M., C.D.
- Petty Officer 1st Class Leanne Marjorie Hebert, M.M.M., C.D.
- Chief Petty Officer 2nd Class Michelle Florence Hopping, M.M.M., C.D.
- Sergeant Gordon Joseph Hynes, M.M.M., C.D.
- Chief Petty Officer 1st Class Joseph François Jean-Claude Sylvain Jaquemot, M.M.M., C.D.
- Ranger Linda Marie Kamenawatamin, M.M.M.
- Chief Petty Officer 2nd Class Chesley Wayne Keeping, M.M.M., C.D.
- Warrant Officer Jamie Knox, M.M.M., C.D.
- Sergeant Marie-Élaine Michèle Labrèche, M.M.M., C.D.
- Master Warrant Officer Marie Josée Guylaine Lapierre, M.M.M., C.D.
- Petty Officer 1st Class Natasha Tanya Lea Leavitt, M.M.M., C.D.
- Chief Petty Officer 1st Class Arvid Donnie Lee, M.M.M., C.D.
- Sergeant Caroline Linteau, M.M.M., C.D.
- Captain Brian John Lougheed, M.M.M., C.D.
- Major Timothy Lourie, M.M.M., C.D.
- Warrant Officer Angel Margaret MacEachern, M.M.M., M.B., C.D.
- Master Warrant Officer Jerome Patrick MacMullin, M.M.M., C.D.
- Master Warrant Officer Duane Lewis May, M.M.M., C.D.
- Master Warrant Officer Trevor Gerard McInnis, M.M.M., C.D.
- Warrant Officer Krista Lea McKeough, M.M.M., C.D.
- Chief Petty Officer 1st Class Dana Bernice McLellan, M.M.M., C.D.
- Chief Warrant Officer David Francis McNeil, M.M.M., C.D.
- Petty Officer 2nd Class Pier-Vincent Michaud, M.M.M., M.M.V., C.D.
- Lieutenant Eldon Heberling Moulton, M.M.M., C.D.
- Master Warrant Officer Sheldon David Murphy, M.M.M., C.D.
- Master Warrant Officer David Basil Myers, M.M.M., C.D.
- Chief Warrant Officer Paul Stewart Nolan, M.M.M., C.D.
- Master Warrant Officer Joseph Guy Éric Normand, M.M.M., C.D.
- Chief Petty Officer 2nd Class John Dwayne Oake, M.M.M., C.D.
- Warrant Officer Suzie Marie Paquin, M.M.M., C.D.
- Master Warrant Officer Joseph Irénée Sébastien Parent, M.M.M., C.D.
- Chief Warrant Officer Richard Plante, M.M.M., C.D.
- Warrant Officer Christian Claude Poirier, M.M.M., C.D.
- Master Warrant Officer Sarah Ann Powers, M.M.M., C.D.
- Master Warrant Officer Rodney Wade Purchase, M.M.M., C.D.
- Master Warrant Officer Daniel Robichaud, M.M.M., C.D.
- Chief Petty Officer 1st Class Stanley Jerome Ryan, M.M.M., C.D.
- Chief Petty Officer 1st Class Thomas Ernest Scott, M.M.M., C.D.
- Ranger Ronald Glenn Scott, M.M.M.
- Chief Warrant Officer Edward Patrick Smith, M.M.M., M.S.M., C.D.
- Master Warrant Officer Michael Adam Smith, M.M.M., M.S.C., C.D.
- Warrant Officer Joseph Armand Rico Smith, M.M.M., M.M.V., C.D.
- Warrant Officer Pierre Hugo St-Laurent, M.M.M., C.D.
- Master Warrant Officer Chester William Tingley, M.M.M., C.D.
- Warrant Officer Joseph Laurence Gilles Turgeon, M.M.M., C.D.
- Major Timothy Morgan Utton, M.M.M., C.D.
- Chief Warrant Officer Mark Alexander von Kalben, M.M.M., C.D.
- Master Warrant Officer Ruel Delroy Walker, M.M.M., C.D.
- Warrant Officer Casey Todd Welbourn, M.M.M., C.D.
- Sergeant Kimberly Wheatland, M.M.M., C.D.
- Lieutenant-Commander Kelly Lynne Williamson, M.M.M., C.D.
- Major Cybèle Jennifer Wilson, M.M.M., C.D.

== Order of Merit of the Police Forces ==
=== Commander of the Order of Merit of the Police Forces ===
Undress ribbon of a Commander of the Order of Merit of the Police Forces

- Chief Jennifer Evans, C.O.M. - This is a promotion within the Order

=== Officers of the Order of Merit of the Police Forces ===
Undress ribbon of an Officer of the Order of Merit of the Police Forces

- Chief Richard M. Bourassa, O.O.M. - This is a promotion within the Order
- Deputy Chief Michael T. Callaghan, O.O.M.
- Assistant Commissioner François Deschênes, O.O.M. - This is a promotion within the Order
- Deputy Chief William (Bill) Charles Fordy, O.O.M. - This is a promotion within the Order
- Chief Kimberley Greenwood, O.O.M.
- Staff Sergeant Roy Lalonde, O.O.M.
- Special Constable Ryan Gregory Prox, O.O.M.

=== Members of the Order of Merit of the Police Forces ===
Undress ribbon of a Member of the Order of Merit of the Police Forces

- Superintendent Alfredo Martin Bangloy, M.O.M.
- Chief Joseph Aloysius Boland, M.O.M.
- Sergeant Dwayne W. Bolen, M.O.M.
- Acting Staff Sergeant Steve Boucher, M.O.M.
- Assistant Commissioner Jasmin Breton, M.O.M.
- Superintendent John William Matthew Brewer, M.O.M.
- Sergeant Mark Christensen, M.O.M.
- Ms. Marnie Clark, M.O.M.
- Chief Gary G. Conn, M.O.M.
- Superintendent Michelle Davey, M.O.M.
- Inspector Benoit Dubé, M.O.M.
- Deputy Chief Lee Foreman, M.O.M.
- Superintendent Thomas Grant Foster, M.O.M.
- Superintendent Shawn Gill, M.O.M.
- Staff Sergeant Kurtis Wayne Grabinsky, M.O.M.
- Superintendent David L. Haye, M.O.M.
- Superintendent John Christopher Kennedy, M.O.M.
- Chief Superintendent Bruce Ian Kirkpatrick, M.O.M.
- Superintendent Ken E. Leppert, M.O.M.
- Inspector Richard Levesque, M.O.M.
- Ms. Cheryl McNeil, M.O.M.
- Inspector Sheri Lynn Meeks, M.O.M.
- Staff Sergeant Debbie Miller, M.O.M.
- Superintendent Clifford J. O’Brien, M.O.M.
- Director Robert Pigeon, M.O.M.
- Superintendent Tammy Ann Pozzobon, M.O.M.
- Constable Cynthia L. Provost, M.O.M.
- Chief Superintendent David W. Quigley, M.O.M.
- Deputy Chief James Ramer, M.O.M.
- Chief Constable Michael James Serr, M.O.M.
- Superintendent Brian W. Shalovelo, M.O.M.
- Staff Sergeant Richard D. Stewart, M.O.M.
- Assistant Commissioner Stephen N. S. Thatcher, M.O.M.
- Superintendent Rohan Kirk Thompson, M.O.M.
- Inspector Joanne Wild, M.O.M.
- Deputy Chief Roger James Wilkie, M.O.M.
- Chief Bryant E. A. Wood, M.O.M.
- Sergeant Michael R. Yanko, M.O.M.
- Superintendent Mitchell K. Yuzdepski, M.O.M.
- Assistant Commissioner Curtis Michael Zablocki, M.O.M.

== Royal Victorian Order ==
Undress ribbon for all grades of the Royal Victorian Order

=== Lieutenant of the Royal Victorian Order ===
- Ricki Brian Ashbee (29 December 2018)

=== Member of the Royal Victorian Order ===
- Tania Marie Carnegie (29 December 2018)

== Most Venerable Order of the Hospital of St. John of Jerusalem ==
Undress ribbon for all grades of the Most Venerable Order of the Hospital of St. John of Jerusalem

=== Knights and Dames of the Order of St. John ===
- Her Honour the Honourable Janet Austin
- Robert Michale Boyko
- Her Honour the Honourable Judy May Foote
- The Honourable Angélique Bernard
- John McDougall, C.D.

=== Commanders of the Order of St. John ===
- Allan Blundell Bird, C.D.
- Michael Dosdall
- John Buckingham Newman

=== Officers of the Order of St. John ===
- Romano Oseo Acconci, C.D.
- Jean Perron
- Deepak Prasad
- Major Steven Mark Daniel
- Sandra Harris
- Captain (Retired) Gary Robert Hayes, C.D.
- Sandra Lynn Ladd
- Adam Nathan Parker
- Glen William Rutland
- David Raymond Valentine, C.D., A.D.C.

=== Members of the Order of St. John ===
- Glen Elvin Bollman
- Thomas Stewart Brown
- Matthew Caindec
- Hélène Caron
- Samantha Grace Carriere
- Marc Chabot
- Jacqueline Starr Cunningham
- Richard Wallace Currie
- Robert Thomas Darlington
- Gilles Deziel
- Judith Anne Doyle
- Vera AnneMarie Dulysh
- Richard Royce Eustace
- Sergeant Beverley Fallon
- Marla Gail Feinstein
- Warrant Officer John Robert Girard, C.D.
- Janet Gay Hazen
- Lindsay Anne Jones
- Karyn Lynn Kennedy
- Kayla Dawn-Marie Leary-Pinch
- Frédéric Lemieux-Legendre
- John Macdonell
- Thomas Jung Mah
- Major (Retired) Ronald Richard Mathews, C.D.
- Warrant Officer Michael Melvin, M.M.M., C.D.
- Hélène Morneau
- Breanna Caitlyn Murphy
- Vincent Pageau
- Naval Cadet Alexander Fisher Pay
- Marc-Antoine Pigeon
- Bharat Rai
- Christine Marie Redekop
- Samantha Roman, C.D.
- William Anderson Siemens
- Ralph Smith
- Lieutenant (N) Mark Andrew Stark, C.D.
- Acting Sub-Lieutenant Dexter Sze Leung Tsui
- Petty Officer 1st Class Kevin John Van Arnhem, C.D.
- Randy Philip Warden
- Ethan Albert Whitehead
- Clare Akintoye
- Dominic Benoit
- Anik Boudreau
- Maria Man-Nga Chen
- Galynne Brooke Cini
- Maxime Demers
- Brian Richard Foley
- Jean-René Guilbault
- Heidi Christina Hanney
- Michelle Hébert
- Eun Ah Lee
- Jeff Mok
- Stacey Savage
- Captain Christopher Arthur Shewchuk, C.D.
- Major (Retired) Gino Nello Simeoni, C.D.
- Cora Jean Thomson
- John Michael Valtonen
- Robert Zeidler

== Provincial Honours ==
=== National Order of Quebec ===
==== Grand Officers of the National Order of Quebec ====
Undress ribbon for a Grand Officer of the National Order of Quebec

- M. Phil Gold - This is a promotion within the Order
- M. Pierre Lassonde - This is a promotion within the Order

==== Officers of the National Order of Quebec ====
Undress ribbon for an Officer of the National Order of Quebec

- M. Daniel Borsuk
- M. Yvon Charest
- M. Fernand Grenier
- Mme Louise Harel
- Mme Trang Hoang
- M. Paul Inchauspé (2015)
- M. Morton S. Minc
- M. Sylvain Moineau
- M. Claude Montmarquette
- M. Charles Morin
- M. Louis Vachon, CM

==== Honorary Knight of the National Order of Quebec ====
Undress ribbon for a Knight of the National Order of Quebec

- Éric-Emmanuel Schmitt

==== Knights of the National Order of Quebec ====
- Mme Sharon Azrieli
- Mme Marie-Dominique Beaulieu
- M. Robert Boily
- Mme Natalie Choquette
- Mme Louise Cordeau
- Mme Micheline Dumont
- M. Laurent Duvernay-Tardif
- M. Yves Gingras
- M. François Girard
- M. Geoffrey Green
- M. Philippe Gros
- M. Jean-Pierre Léger
- M. Geoff Molson
- M. Robert Panet-Raymond
- M. Michel Phaneuf
- M. Robert E. Prud’homme
- Mme Louise Sicuro
- M. Roland Smith
- M. Alain Trudel
- Mme Maïr Verthuy
- M. Denis Villeneuve
- M. Florent Vollant.

=== Saskatchewan Order of Merit ===
Undress ribbon for a member of the Saskatchewan Order of Merit

- Don Atchison
- Doug Cuthand
- Grit McCreath
- Lyn Goldman, LL.D.
- Andy Potter, FCAHS
- William F. Ready, Q.C., B.A., J.D., LL.D.

=== Order of Ontario ===
Undress ribbon for a member of the Order of Ontario

- Last appointments in 2017.

=== Order of British Columbia ===
Undress ribbon for a member of the Order of British Columbia

- David H. Brewer
- John A. Brink
- Scott McIntyre
- Dr. Judy McLean
- Murray Farmer
- Lynda Farmer
- Dr. Carl J. Walters
- Ronald L. Cliff
- The Honourable Patricia Carney
- Dr. Kimit Rai
- Susan Tatoosh
- Dr. Bruce McManus
- Tamara Vrooman
- Jane Coop
- David Kampe (posthumous)

=== Alberta Order of Excellence ===
Undress ribbon for a member of the Alberta Order of Excellence

- Robert Burrell
- Bonnie DuPont
- Katie Ohe
- Ron Sakamoto
- Beckie Scott
- Malcolm Sissons
- Muriel Stanley Venne
- Frances Wright

=== Order of Prince Edward Island ===
Undress ribbon for a member of the Order of Prince Edward Island

- Jeanette Arsenault
- Leo Broderick
- Dr. Najmul H. Chishti

=== Order of Manitoba ===
Undress ribbon for a member of the Order of Manitoba

- Vivian Bruce
- Marcel A. Desautels
- James Ehnes
- Kathy Hildebrand
- Arvid Loewen
- Clarence Nepinak
- Steven Schipper
- Trudy Schroeder
- Harvey Secter
- Joy Smith
- Michael West

=== Order of New Brunswick ===
Undress ribbon for a member of the Order of New Brunswick

- Patricia Bernard
- Héliodore Côté
- Michel Doucet
- Léo Johnson
- Lois Scott
- Robyn Tingley
- Abraham Beverley Walker
- James “Jim” Wilson
- Claire Wilt
- John Wood

=== Order of Nova Scotia ===
Undress ribbon for a member of the Order of Nova Scotia

- Dr. Elizabeth Cromwell, C.M. (Posthumous)
- Francis Dorrington
- Dr. Noni MacDonald
- Ann MacLean
- David M. McKeage (Posthumous)

=== Order of Newfoundland and Labrador ===
Undress ribbon for a member of the Order of Newfoundland and Labrador

- Joseph Butler
- The Honourable Richard Cashin, P.C., OC
- Paula Dawe
- Rev. Arthur G. Elliott
- Darryl Fry
- Cassandra Ivany
- Kaetlyn Osmond
- Odelle Pike
- John Christopher Pratt, CC
- Dr. Lloydetta Quaicoe

== Territorial Honours ==
=== Order of Nunavut ===
Undress ribbon for a member of the Order of Nunavut

- Peter Tapatai

=== Order of the Northwest Territories ===
Undress ribbon for a member of the Order of Northwest Territories

- Lyda Fuller
- "Buffalo" Joe McBryan

=== Order of Yukon ===
Undress ribbon for a member of the Order of Yukon

- Doug Bell
- Ione Christensen
- Patricia Ellis
- Judy Gingell
- Percy Henry
- Gary Hewitt
- Rolf Hougen
- Dave Joe
- Sam Johnston
- Lyall Murdoch

== Canadian Bravery Decorations ==
=== Star of Courage ===
Undress ribbon for the Star of Courage

- Constable Nicholas Crowther
- Constable Ryan Barnett
- David E. Fragoso
- Constable Josh McSweeney

=== Medal of Bravery ===
Undress ribbon for the Medal of Bravery

- Daniel Gilbert Arnold
- Michael Douglas Barkhouse
- Constable Rafael Beaulieu
- David Bose
- Constable Trevor Joseph Bragnola
- Petty Officer 1st Class Charles Wesley Bressette, C.D.
- Constable David Brosinsky
- Captain Bryce Carey
- Master Corporal Jesus Castillo
- Sergeant David J. Cowan
- Master Corporal Kashif Dar
- Andrew Gregory Daub
- Charlène Desrosiers
- Raymond Doucette
- Michael Allen Easton
- Daryl Eckert
- Richard William Fisk
- Michael G. Galbraith
- Branden Gertzen
- Cameron Gouck
- Timothy John Harrison
- Keegan Herries
- Hayley Hesseln
- Sergeant Andrea Karistinos, C.D.
- Sergeant Derek King
- Captain Michael Lawrence Kristy, C.D.
- Master Corporal Ryan Kristy
- Sergeant Jérémie Landry
- Petty Officer 2nd Class David Alan LeBlanc, C.D.
- Rodney Wayne McAlpine
- Robert David McDonald
- Sean James Laurimer McGuinnis
- Don McNeice
- Byron Meston
- Cole Mitchell
- Charles Pealey
- Andrew Pearson
- Richard Pick
- Quiming Qi
- Yun Qi
- Constable Adam Rayner
- Tristan Reddy
- Tyler Reddy
- Len Anthony Rice
- Gabriel Roy-Lacouture
- Chelsi Sabbe
- Thierry Sauvain
- Sean Leslie Silverthorne
- Paul Derek Snow
- Constable Ashley Steven Thompson
- Michael Tompkins
- Trevor Vanderhyden
- Michael Waldner
- Michael Went
- Constable Tyler White
- Ryan Wurtz
- Alexandre Beaudoin-Vachon
- Michel Denis Bourbonniere, M.S.M.
- Erik Richard Brown
- Marie-Soleil Côté-Lepage
- Sergeant Paul Dungey
- Sergeant Michael Fonseca
- Shachar Gabay
- Christopher Gascon
- Constable Brandon Goudey
- Constable George Hunter
- Corporal Guy Johnson
- Constable Kyle Josey
- Corporal Peter King
- Master Seaman Emmanuel Lemieux
- Frédéric Lord
- Constable Ron Lyver
- Leading Seaman Reeves Paul Anthony Matheson
- Detective Steve McCuaig
- Corporal Jean-Guy Christian Pascal Richard
- John Schuiteboer
- Connor Stanley
- Constable Timothy Stevens
- Sébastien Tousignant
- Will Wang

== Meritorious Service Decorations ==
=== Second Award of the Meritorious Service Cross (Military Division) ===
Undress ribbon for a second award of the Meritious Service Cross in the military division

Brigadier-General Conrad Joseph John Mialkowski, O.M.M., M.S.C., C.D.

=== Meritorious Service Cross (Military Division) ===
Undress ribbon for Meritious Service Cross in the military division

- Commander Sheldon Roderick Kyle Gillis, C.D.
- Corporal Alexander Nicolas Papineau-Levesque
- Brigadier-General Trevor John Cadieu, O.M.M., M.S.M., C.D.
- Sergeant Jeffery Theodore Oshanyk, C.D.
- Major-General Joseph Paul Alain Pelletier, O.M.M., M.S.M., C.D.
- Brigadier-General Steven Joseph Russel Whelan, O.M.M., M.S.M., C.D.

=== Meritorious Service Cross (Civil Division) ===
Undress ribbon for Meritious Service Cross in the civilian division

- Isseldin M. M. Abuelaish, O.Ont., M.S.C.
- Kahlil Baker, M.S.C.
- Pierre Duval, M.S.C.
- François Fassier, M.S.C.
- Gerald Mitchel Fried, M.S.C.
- Samuel Gervais, M.S.C.
- Richard Howard Gimblett, M.S.C., C.D.
- David Carl Hein, M.S.C.
- Laura Howard, M.S.C.
- Cynthia Lickers-Sage, M.S.C.
- Tobias Lütke, M.S.C.
- Alaa Mohamed Murabit, M.S.C.
- Losang Chodon Rabgey, M.S.C.
- Tsering Dolker Rabgey, M.S.C.
- Tashi Yangzom Rabgey, M.S.C.
- Pencho Rabgey, M.S.C.
- Sandra Muir Reilly, M.S.C.
- Ellen Remai, M.S.C.
- Frank Remai, M.S.C. (Posthumous)
- Michael Rubinoff, M.S.C.
- Irene Sankoff, M.S.C.
- Lisa Steele, M.S.C.
- Kim Tomczak, M.S.C.
- Sam J. Tsemberis, M.S.C.
- Brooke van Mossel-Forrester, M.S.C.
- Jean Vincent, M.S.C.

=== Second Award of the Meritorious Service Medal (Military Division) ===
Undress ribbon for the Meritious Service Medal in the military division

- Brigadier-General David James Anderson, O.M.M., M.S.M., C.D.
- Major Michael Roy Deutsch, M.S.M., C.D.
- Colonel Mark Anthony Gasparotto, M.S.M., C.D.
- Colonel Joseph Pierre Huet, M.S.M., C.D.
- Chief Warrant Officer Michael Patrick Forest, M.M.M., M.S.M., C.D.

=== Meritorious Service Medal (Military Division) ===
- Lieutenant-Colonel George Michael Albert Boyuk, C.D.
- Commander Ramona Lynn Burke, C.D.
- Chief Petty Officer 2nd Class Randolph Shawn Byrnes, C.D.
- Warrant Officer Danny Carl Compton, C.D.
- Lieutenant-Colonel Corey Jason Frederickson, C.D.
- Commander Jacob French, C.D.
- Sergeant Nicholas Shawn Hancock, C.D.
- Captain(N) Steve Jorgensen, C.D.
- Petty Officer 1st Class Joseph Kiraly, C.D.
- Lieutenant-Colonel Erik Antony Liebert, C.D.
- Lieutenant-Commander Jason Lorette
- Lieutenant-Colonel Robert Jeffrey Lyttle, C.D.
- Major Michael MacKillop, M.M.V., C.D.
- Commander Gordon Willis Jacob Noseworthy, C.D.
- Leading Seaman Patrick James Parkhill
- Colonel Douglas Peter Pietrowski (USA)
- Lieutenant-Colonel Ryan Zane Sexsmith, C.D.
- Commander Michael Scott Shortridge, C.D.
- Captain(N) Michael James Tennant, C.D.
- Commander Michael Thomson, C.D.
- Chief Warrant Officer Thomas Kenneth Verner, M.M.M., C.D.
- Major Wayne Terence Wong, C.D.
- Colonel Joseph Antoine Dave Abboud, M.S.C., M.M.V., C.D.
- Lieutenant-Colonel Fraser George Auld, C.D.
- Sergeant Gary Barrett
- Petty Officer 1st Class Jason William Bode, C.D.
- Captain(N) Daniel Joseph Jacques Larry Bouchard, C.D.
- Warrant Officer Nicolas Robin Côté, C.D.
- Chief Warrant Officer Andrew Jack Durnford, M.M.M., C.D.
- Lieutenant-Colonel Sean Martin French, C.D.
- Lieutenant-Colonel Mark Christopher Hickey, C.D.
- Chief Petty Officer 1st Class Joseph François Jean-Claude Sylvain Jacquemot, C.D.
- Colonel Andrew Ronald Jayne, C.D.
- Major Alan Lockerby, C.D.
- Lieutenant-Colonel Mark James Lubiniecki, C.D.
- Chief Warrant Officer Robert Claude McCann, M.M.M., C.D.
- Lieutenant-Colonel Thomas Edmund Murphy, C.D.
- Colonel Donald Potoczny (U.S.A.)
- Lieutenant-Colonel Kristopher Michael Reeves, C.D.
- Major Joseph Pascal Jean David Roberge, C.D.
- Sergeant Jason Charles Toole
- Master Corporal Alexander Yu

=== Meritorious Service Medal (Civil Division) ===
Undress ribbon for Meritious Service Medal in the civilian division

- Oleh Michael Antonyshyn, M.S.M.
- Roland Barbier, M.S.M.
- Diana Christina Beaupré, M.S.M.
- Richard Bennett, M.S.M.
- Willa Black, M.S.M.
- Narcisse Tatsikiistamik Blood, M.S.M. (Posthumous)
- Caroline Bouchard, M.S.M.
- Monique A. D. Bourassa, M.S.M.
- Gabriel Bran Lopez, M.S.M.
- Sylvain Brosseau, M.S.M.
- Gregory Robert Medlock Brown, M.S.M.
- Mary Anne V. Chambers, O.Ont., M.S.M.
- Diane Chênevert, C.Q., M.S.M.
- Rachel Corneille Gravel, M.S.M.
- Norman D. Crerar, M.S.M.
- Barbara Ellen Crook, M.S.M.
- John R. Dallaire, M.S.M.
- Aldo E. J. Del Col, M.S.M.
- Gilles Desjardins, M.S.M.
- Virginia Edmonds, M.S.M.
- John Morris Fairbrother, M.S.M.
- Olivier Farmer, M.S.M.
- Lison Gagné, M.S.M.
- Brian O’Neill Gallery, M.S.M.
- Sally F. E. Goddard, M.S.M.
- Daniel George Greenberg, M.S.M.
- Israel Imoukhuede Aikodion Idonije, O.M., M.S.M.
- A. Lois Kalchman, M.S.M.
- Bob Lyle Kayseas, M.S.M.
- Catherine J. Keddy, M.S.M.
- Paul A. Keddy, M.S.M.
- Janet F. Kitz, M.S.M.
- Frank Korvemaker, M.S.M.
- Irene C. Kroeker, M.S.M.
- Rachel Lapierre, M.S.M.
- Robert E. LeBlanc, M.S.M.
- Ronald Oscar Linden, M.S.M.
- Julie E. Lohnes-Cashin, M.S.M.
- Kathryn Lorna Lucking, M.S.M.
- Morley Stuart Lymburner, M.S.M.
- Robin Mednick, M.S.M.
- Mitchell Ryan Moffit, M.S.M.
- Éric Nadeau, M.S.M.
- Monique Nolett-Ille, M.S.M.
- Patrick J. O’Brien, M.S.M.
- Morgane Louise-Marie Oger, M.S.M.
- Gradimir Pankov, M.S.M.
- Brad Richards, M.S.M.
- Joseph Michael Roberts, M.S.M.
- Marie Saint Pierre, C.M., C.Q., M.S.M.
- Habeeb H. Salloum, M.S.M.
- Amar Sangha, M.S.M.
- Beverley Tosh, M.S.M.
- Adrian Watkinson, M.S.M.
- Bev Woods-Percival, M.S.M.
- Hana Zalzal, M.S.M.

=== Secret appointments ===
- 5 January 2019 : Her Excellency the Right Honourable Julie Payette, Governor General and Commander-in-Chief of Canada, on the recommendation of the Chief of the Defence Staff, has awarded a Meritorious Service Cross and a Meritorious Service Medal to members of the Canadian Armed Forces for military activities of high standard that have brought great honour to the Canadian Armed Forces and to Canada. For security and operational reasons, the recipient names and citations have not been released.
- 6 July 2019: On behalf of THE QUEEN, the Governor General, on the recommendation of the Chief of the Defence Staff, has awarded a Meritorious Service Cross and a Meritorious Service Medal to members of the Canadian Armed Forces for military activities of high standard that have brought great honour to the Canadian Armed Forces and to Canada. For security and operational reasons, the recipient names and citations have not been released.

== Mention in Dispatches ==
- Master Corporal Sean David, C.D.

== Polar Medal ==
Undress ribbon of the Polar Medal

- Curtis L. Brown,
- Susan Jennifer Chatwood
- John P. Smol, O.C.

== Commonwealth and Foreign Orders, Decorations and Medal awarded to Canadians ==
=== From Her Majesty The Queen in Right of Barbados ===
Undress ribbon for all grades of the Order of Barbados

==== Silver Crown of Merit of the Order of Barbados ====
- Dr. John Edward Hutson

=== From Her Majesty The Queen in Right of Jamaica ===
Undress ribbon for the Jamaican Prime Minister's Medal of Appreciation

==== Prime Minister’s Medal of Appreciation for Service to Jamaica ====
- Mr. Desmond Emerson Edward Doran
- Ms. Claudette Yvonne Cameron Stewart

=== From Her Majesty The Queen of New Zealand ===
Undress ribbon for all grades of the New Zealand Order of Merit

==== Member of the New Zealand Order of Merit ====
- Dr. Ruth Busch

=== From Her Majesty The Queen in Right of the United Kingdom ===
Undress ribbon for a member of the Order of the Companions of Honour Ribbon

==== Member of the Order of the Companions of Honour ====
- Dr. Margaret Eleanor Atwood, CC OOnt FRSC

==== Commander of the Most Excellent Order of the British Empire ====
Undress ribbon for all grades of the Most Excellent Order of the British Empire within the civil division

- Ms. Elizabeth Denham
- Dr. Corinne Le Quéré

==== Officer of the Most Excellent Order of the British Empire ====
- Ms. Nicola Mary Louise Yates
- Mr. Roger Malbert
- Ms. Janet Lynn Paterson

==== Member of the Most Excellent Order of the British Empire ====
- Ms. Lea Baroudi
- Mr. Michael James Winfield
- Mr. Alfred Smithers

==== British Empire Medal ====
- Ms. Karin Elizabeth Snape
- Mr. Kevin Timothy Routledge

=== From the President of the Republic of Colombia ===
Undress ribbon for a Grand Officer of the Order of Military Merit “José María Córdova”

==== Grand Officer of the Order of Military Merit “José María Córdova” ====
- Brigadier-General Stephen Lacroix

=== From the President of the Republic of Finland ===
Undress ribbon for a Knight of the Order of the Lion of Finland

==== Knight of the Order of the Lion of Finland, 1st Class ====
- Mr. Theodore Bossé
- Ms. Eija Peltokangas

==== Knight of the Order of the Lion of Finland ====
- Mr. Reijo Viitala

=== From the President of the French Republic ===
Undress ribbon for a Commander of the National Order of the Legion of Honour

==== Commander of the National Order of the Legion of Honour ====
- Ms. Marie-Josée Kravis

==== Officer of the National Order of Merit ====
Undress ribbon for an Officer of the National Order of Merit

- Ms. Sophie d’Amours

==== National Medal of Recognition for victims of terrorism ====
Undress ribbon for the National Medal of Recognition for victims of terrorism

- Mr. Paul Joseph Racette
- Mrs. Camille Racette Roussel
- Mr. Emerson J. Racette Roussel

==== Officer of the Order of Arts and Letters ====
Undress ribbon for an Officer of the Order of Arts and Letters

- Mr. Guy Delisle
- Mr. Xavier Dolan

==== Commander of the Order of the Academic Palms ====
Undress ribbon for a Knight of the Order of the Academic Palms

- Mr. Gaston Sauvé

==== Knight of the Order of the Academic Palms ====
- Mr. Allister Surette

==== Knight of the Order of Agricultural Merit ====
Undress ribbon for a Knight of the Order of Agricultural Merit

- Mr. Jean-Pierre Vaillancourt

==== Overseas Medal with Middle East Clasp ====
- Major Simon Brochu

==== National Defence Medal, Gold Echelon ====
Undress ribbon for the National Defence Medal, Gold Echelon

- Lieutenant-Colonel Martin Arcand

==== National Defence Medal, Silver Echelon ====
- Major Jean Ferland

==== National Defence Medal, Bronze Echelon with Armée de terre clasp ====
- Colonel Jason Langelier

==== National Defence Medal, Bronze Echelon ====
- Major Nancy Guerin
- Major Francis Lavoie

=== From the President of the Federal Republic of Germany ===
==== Cross of the Order of Merit of the Federal Republic of Germany ====
- Mr. Harald Wilfred Kuckertz

=== From the President of Hungary ===
==== Gold Cross of Merit of the Republic of Hungary (Civil Division) ====
- Mr. Ferenc (Francis) Jagodits
- Mr. Stephen Willerding

=== From His Majesty The Emperor of Japan ===
==== Order of the Rising Sun, Gold Rays with Neck Ribbon ====
- Mr. Kenneth Zaifman
- Mr. Claude-Yves Charron
- Mr. Ben Ciprietti

==== Order of the Rising Sun, Gold Rays with Rosette ====
- Mr. Roy Tadayoshi Asa

==== Order of the Rising Sun, Gold and Silver Rays ====
- Mr. Frank Moritsugu
- Ms. Heather Blackwood Newman

==== Order of the Rising Sun, Silver Rays ====
- Mr. Soichiro Yamamoto

=== From the President of the Republic of Kosovo ===
==== Presidential Jubilee Medal for the 10th Anniversary of Independence ====
- Mr. Ross Reid
- Mr. Charles Aaron Rogers

=== From the President of the Republic of Latvia ===
==== Order of the Three Stars, Category 3 ====
- Mrs. Alide Ausma Forstmanis
- Mr. Alain Hausser

==== Order of the Three Stars, Category 5 ====
- Ms. Linda Maruta Kronbergs

=== From the President of the Republic of Lithuania ===
==== Medal of the Order of the Cross of Vytis ====
- Mr. Kostas Rimsa

=== From the President of the Republic of Poland ===
==== Knight’s Cross of the Order of Polonia Restituta ====
Undress ribbon for a Knight's Cross of the Order of Polonia Restituta

- Mr. Krzysztof Garbowicz

==== Knight’s Cross of the Order of Merit of the Republic of Poland ====
Undress ribbon for a Knight's Cross (5th class) of the Order of Merit of the Republic of Poland

- Ms. Malgorzata Karbowska
- Mr. Anthony Muszynski

==== Cross of Freedom and Solidarity ====
Cross of Freedom and Solidaritya

- Mr. Tomasz Bakalarz
- Mr. Bogdan Idzikowski
- Mr. Andrzej Lozinski

==== Gold Cross of Merit ====
Undress ribbon for the Gold Cross of Merit

- Ms. Maria Bulzacka
- Ms. Sylwia Barbara Krupa
- Ms. Edyta Tobiasz
- Ms. Hanna Wielocha
- Mr. Kazimierz Zarebicki
- Mr. Edward Bukowski
- Mr. Jan Kraska

==== Silver Cross of Merit ====
Undress ribbon for the Silver Cross of Merit

- Mr. Robert Jekosz
- Ms. Dorota Zofia Rajewska

==== Silver Medal for Long Service ====
Undress ribbon for the silver medal for Long Service

- Mr. Eric Boyd Garland

==== Long Marital Life Medal ====
Undress ribbon of the Medal for Long Marital Life

- Mrs. Wieslawa Potocka
- Mr. Zygmunt Wladyslaw Potocki
- Mr. Wladyslaw Chlebek
- Mrs. Zofia Chlebek
- Mrs. Maria Jolanta Manuska
- Mr. Andrzej Manuski

==== Siberian Exile Cross ====
- Ms. Genowefa Matkowski
- Mr. Roman Pieczonka
- Mr. Jerzy Steciuk
- Ms. Eleonora Kuczkowska

==== Medal of the Centenary of Polish Independence ====
Undress ribbon for the Medal of the Centenary of Polish Independence

- Mr. Janusz Szepietowski

=== From His Majesty The King of Spain ===
==== Officer’s Cross of the Order of Civil Merit ====
Undress ribbon of an Officer of the Order of Civil Merit of the Kingdom of Spain

- Mr. Anthony Aspler

=== From the President of Ukraine ===
==== Cross of Ivan Mazepa ====
Undress ribbon of the Cross of Ivan Mazepa

- Mr. Lubomyr Luciuk

=== From the President of the United States of America ===
==== Officer of the Legion of Merit ====
Undress ribbon of an Officer of the Legion of Merit of the United States

- Colonel Douglas Baird
- Captain Marc Wayne Joseph Batsford
- Brigadier-General Martin Andres Frank
- Brigadier-General Stephen R. Kelsey
- Brigadier-General Roberto G. Mazzolin
- Brigadier-General Brian W. McPherson
- Lieutenant-General J. J. Pierre St-Amand
- Brigadier-General Thomas P. Dunne
- Colonel Kevin F. Bryski
- Colonel Roch Pelletier

==== Legionnaire of the Legion of Merit ====
Undress ribbon of a Legionnaire of the Legion of Merit of the United States

- Colonel Scott N. Clancy

==== Defence Meritorious Service Medal ====
Undress ribbon of the Defence Meritorious Service Medal of the United States

- Colonel Orest M. Babij
- Lieutenant-Colonel Phillip N. Breton
- Colonel Dan Chafai
- Lieutenant-Colonel Derek R. Crabbe
- Lieutenant-Colonel Robert S. Dunn
- Colonel Jean-François Duval
- Major Renee M. M. R. Forcier
- Lieutenant-Colonel Cory A. Gillis
- Lieutenant-Colonel Benjamin Irvine
- Lieutenant-Colonel Scott A. Johnson
- Lieutenant-Colonel Guy Leclerc
- Major Nelson C. Lewis
- Major Timothy P. Lilienthal
- Lieutenant-Commander Ian M. Lynam
- Lieutenant-Colonel Robert J. Lyttle
- Major Michal Mendyka
- Major Christopher G. Miller
- Colonel Alan P. Mulawyshyn
- Lieutenant-Colonel Brian Nekurak
- Major Kevin J. Pruden
- Colonel Joseph S. Shipley
- Colonel John D. V. Vass
- Lieutenant-Colonel Larry Weir
- Colonel Helen Louise Wright
- Lieutenant-Commander Louis C. Haché
- Commander Christopher J. Hargreaves
- Major Nathan Hevenor
- Lieutenant-Commander Ian D. Matheson
- Major Alex Prymack
- Major Sepp J. W. Rodgers
- Major John P. W. Doig
- Major Frederick Keays Levesque
- Lieutenant-Colonel Robert W. Patchett
- Major Michael B. Peters
- Warrant Officer Chad L. Raycraft
- Major Joseph S. Thomson
- Sergeant Gisèle Marie Adams
- Lieutenant(N) Yoon Su An
- Major Christopher Belgum
- Captain(N) Daniel Bouchard
- Captain Derric F. Bowes-Lyon
- Major Véronique Brassard-Lavoie
- Major Mark Anthony Castelli
- Major Christian K. Chriska
- Major Dany Côté
- Major Stéphane Damato
- Major Kevin Davis
- Lieutenant-Colonel David G. Fearon
- Lieutenant-Colonel Ronald J. Fitzgerald
- Major Neil G. George
- Commander Troy D. Gillespie
- Sergeant Geneviève Harnois
- Lieutenant-Colonel James S. Kettles
- Major Alexis Legros
- Commander Roland D. Leyte
- Lieutenant-Colonel Charleen MacCulloch
- Lieutenant(N) Rebecca MacDonald
- Colonel Serge L. Menard
- Sergeant Ladean Morton
- Major Brigitte B. Noel
- Lieutenant-Commander Robert R. Ouellette
- Sergeant Maxime Paquin
- Warrant Officer Michael Pastuck
- Lieutenant-Colonel Michael R. Percy
- Major Stephen Ramey
- Sergeant James W. L. Reid
- Major Shahab Rezaei-Zadeh
- Major Scott K. Roach
- Major Tanya Raylene Robertson
- Lieutenant-Colonel Andrew T. Rule
- Lieutenant-Colonel Alain J. P. Veilleux
- Captain David Von Neppel

==== Meritorious Service Medal, First Oak Leaf Cluster ====
- Lieutenant-Colonel Michael Fawcett

==== Meritorious Service Medal ====
Undress ribbon of the Meritorious Service Medal of the United States

- Colonel Angela M. Banville
- Major Jonathan Russell Norman Barnes
- Major Christine Theresa Bazarin
- Colonel Jean R. J. Bernier
- Major Tancrède Bérubé
- Captain Matthew D. Boire
- Major Steven M. Card
- Major Kelly Chow
- Superintendent Derek R. Cooke
- Major Jason Czarnecki
- Lieutenant-Colonel Damon J. Dyer
- Lieutenant-Colonel Francis Clifford Egan
- Major Stephane Fortier
- Major John D. Gilchrist
- Major Thomas M. Hammond
- Captain Stephen Irwin
- Captain Ahmad Jaradat
- Major Michelle L. Karasek
- Major Darin M. Kenny
- Major Sylvain F. Lapierre
- Master Warrant Officer Mark Laroche
- Major Curtis E. Penney
- Major Dennis S. Sansom
- Lieutenant-Colonel Jeffrey James Schamehorn
- Lieutenant-Colonel Jean-François Simard
- Major Thomas L. St. Onge
- Major John K. Wade
- Major Jason Edward Zelward
- Major Jameel J. Janjua
- Major Andrew M. Lunn
- Lieutenant-Colonel Kevin H. Tromp
- Major Alexandre Dumulon-Perreault
- Lieutenant-Colonel Dale M. Campbell
- Major Glenn G. Sylvester

==== Air Medal ====
Undress ribbon of the United States Air Medal

- Captain Byron R. Dennis
- Captain Bruce J. Derbyshire
- Sergeant Kimberly L. Fournier
- Captain Matthew R. Galvin
- Master Corporal Daniel V. Mihichuk

===== First Oak, Third Oak and Fourth Oak Leaf Clusters =====
- Major David A. McNiff

== Erratums of Commonwealth and Foreign Orders, Decorations and Medal awarded to Canadians ==
=== Amendments for 26 April 2014 ===
==== From His Majesty The King of Spain ====
===== Officer of the Order of Civil Merit =====
- Mr. Barry Brown

=== Amendments for 26 May 2018 ===
==== From the President of the Republic of France ====
===== Knight of the National Order of Merit =====
- Mr. Yves Tiberghien

===== National Defence Medal, Gold Echelon =====
- Colonel Cayle Ian Oberwarth
- Brigadier-General Steven Joseph Russell Whelan

=== Amendments for 27 October 2018 ===
==== From the Government of Hungary ====
===== Knight’s Cross of the Order of Merit of Hungary (Civil Division) =====
- Ms. Andrea Blanar
- Mr. Peter Csermely
- Mr. Leslie Lewis Dan
- Mr. Kalman Dreisziger
- Mr. Balazs Jaschko
- Mr. Marton Seregelyes
- Mr. Zoltan Vass

== See also ==
- 2019 British Birthday Honours
- 2019 British Birthday Honours
