= Brian Patneaude =

- Born: August 8, 1974 (age 51)
- Genres: Jazz, salsa, merengue
- Occupation: Musician
- Instrument: Saxophone
- Years active: 1992–present

Brian Patneaude (born August 8, 1974) is an American jazz saxophonist and band leader from Schenectady, New York, with several notable jazz recordings. He has performed throughout the northeastern United States and Canada, as well as conducting a tour of Russia. He has performed with Alex Torres, Colleen Pratt, Tom Healey, the Erftones, the Empire Jazz Orchestra, Collider, and Joe Glickman. He has had a solo career and leads his own band (ranging from a duet to quintet). He has produced all of his recordings.

== Biography ==
=== Early life and career ===
Brian Patneaude was born on August 8, 1974, in Schenectady, New York. He received his bachelor's degree in music education at the College of St. Rose and received a full scholarship to the Cincinnati College-Conservatory of Music at the University of Cincinnati for graduate studies.

While in college, he worked with several ensembles. He performed at the Newport Jazz Festival in Saratoga Springs, New York and toured Russia for two weeks. He studied saxophone with Paul Evoskevich, Rick VanMatre, and Tom Walsh and jazz improvisation with Pat Harbison.

=== Performing ===
Patneaude joined the Alex Torres orchestra in 2000. This is a 12-piece salsa, merengue, and Latin jazz band based in upstate New York. While he was part of the orchestra, he recorded three albums with them, Elementos, Punto de Vista, and 25 to Life. They toured throughout the United States and Canada, including the Montreal Jazz Festival, the Rochester International Jazz Festival, the Master Musician Festival in Kentucky, Lake Eden Arts Festival in North Carolina, and the Bethlehem Musikfest in Pennsylvania.

In 2001 he joined the Empire Jazz Orchestra, a 19-piece jazz band in which he has played with Jimmy Heath, Slide Hampton, Wycliffe Gordon, Randy Brecker, Rufus Reid, and The Four Freshmen.

== Discography ==
=== As leader ===
- Variations (WEPA, 2003)
- Distance (WEPA, 2005)
- As We Know It (WEPA, 2007)
- Riverview (WEPA, 2009)
- All Around Us (WEPA, 2012)
