= Carolyn J. Stefanco =

Carolyn Stefanco

11th President of the College of Saint Rose
- In office July 1, 2014 – June 30, 2020

Personal details
- Born: New Jersey, U.S.
- Education: University of Colorado Boulder (BA); Binghamton University (MA); Duke University (PhD)

Carolyn J. Stefanco (born 1957) is a former American professor and academic administrator.

== Early life and education ==
Stefanco was raised in North Jersey and is the first member of her family to attend college. Stefanco earned a Bachelor of Arts degree in history from the University of Colorado Boulder, a Master of Arts in women's history from Binghamton University, and a PhD in history from Duke University.

== Career ==
Stefanco worked as an assistant professor at Wheaton College. She then moved to California Polytechnic State University, where she became a tenured professor, chair of the history department, and director of the women's studies program. Stefanco then served as vice president for academic affairs at Agnes Scott College and as the founding dean of the College of Humanities and Social Sciences at California State University, Stanislaus.

Stefanco was selected as the 11th President of the College of Saint Rose in April 2014 and took office on July 1, 2014. During Stefanco's tenure, the college developed new degree programs, including cybersecurity, musical performance, and specialized computer science offerings. Amid budget cuts, Stefanco also reduced funding for several departments, and eliminated the philosophy, American studies, sociology, and economics programs. After several programs were eliminated, Stefanco faced a vote of no confidence in 2016, though she remained in her position. That same year, the college was also censured by the American Association of University Professors.

On March 3, 2020, the college announced that Stefanco would step down as president of the College of Saint Rose effective June 30, 2020. She was succeeded by interim president Marcia White. The College of Saint Rose closed at the end of the 2023-24 academic year, citing years of financial struggle.
