= Legit =

Legit, a slang abbreviation of the word legitimate, may refer to:

- Legit (professional wrestling)
- Legit (2006 TV series), a Scottish sitcom
- Legit (2013 TV series), created by comedian Jim Jefferies
- Legit.ng, a Nigerian digital media and news platform
- LEGIT (Lesbian and Gay Immigration Task Force), a Canadian organization founded in 1991
- "Legit", a song by Nas from the album King's Disease III (2022)

== See also ==
- Legitimacy (disambiguation)
