= Gilles Ste-Croix =

Canadian businessman

Gilles Ste-Croix OC
- Born: La Sarre, Québec, Canada
- Occupation: Entrepreneur
- Known for: Cirque du Soleil

Gilles Ste-Croix OC (French pronunciation: [ʒil sɛ̃tkʁwa]) is a Canadian entrepreneur and the vice president and co-creator of Cirque du Soleil. He started Cirque du Soleil with co-founder Guy Laliberté. His son, Olivier Rochette, a technician with Cirque du Soleil, was killed by a blow to the head from an aerial lift in an on-set accident in November 2016.

Ste-Croix was appointed an Officer of the Order of Canada (OC) in the 2019 Canadian honours.
