= Legitimacy =

Legitimacy, from the Latin legitimare meaning "to make lawful", may refer to:

- Legitimacy (criminal law)
- Legitimacy (family law)
- Legitimacy (political)

== See also ==
- Bastard (law of England and Wales)
- Illegitimate (film), a 2016 Romanian film
- Illegitimacy in fiction
- Legit (disambiguation)
- Legitimate (professional wrestling)
- Legitimate expectation
- Legitimate peripheral participation
- Legitimate theater
- Legitimation
- Legitime
- Legitimists (disambiguation)
- Nomen illegitimum in botany is a valid published name that contravenes the international articles
- Sources of law
