= College of Saint Rose =

Private college in Albany, New York, US

The College of Saint Rose
- Emblem of The College of Saint Rose
- Motto: In Tuo Lumine Videbimus Lumen (Latin)
- Motto in English: In Thy Light We Shall See Light
- Type: Private college
- Active: 1920–2024
- Affiliations: CIC
- Religious affiliation: Catholic (Sisters of Saint Joseph)
- Location: Albany, New York, United States; 42.663981°N 73.786781°W
- Campus: Urban
- Colors: White, Black, Gold
- Nickname: Golden Knights
- Sporting affiliations: NCAA Division II – Northeast-10
- Website: strose.edu (archived)

The College of Saint Rose was a private college from 1920 to 2024 in Albany, New York, United States. The State University of New York at Albany serves the custodian of records for the college following its closure.

The school was founded in 1920 by the Sisters of St. Joseph of Carondelet as a Catholic women's college, and it became fully coeducational in the 1969–1970 academic year. The following year, the college added laypersons to its board and became an independent college sponsored by the Sisters of St. Joseph. The college was located in the Pine Hills neighborhood of Albany. It was a Division II member of the National Collegiate Athletic Association (NCAA).

In June 2023, after many years of financial difficulties, the college's accreditor, the Middle States Commission on Higher Education, publicly warned the college that it was in danger of losing its accreditation. The college closed in June 2024.

== History ==
The idea for The College of Saint Rose was conceived by Joseph A. Delaney, the vicar general of the Roman Catholic Diocese of Albany, in 1920. Delaney contacted Blanche Rooney, a member of the local chapter of the Sisters of Saint Joseph of Carondelet in the Provincial House on Eighth Street in Troy, New York. Rooney and her sisters were receptive to the idea and, with the permission and support of Bishop of Albany Edmund F. Gibbons and Rooney, Delaney purchased the William Keeler estate at 979 Madison Avenue. The College of Saint Rose was established as a Catholic college for women with a liberal arts curriculum in Albany, New York when it received a provisional charter from the Board of Regents on June 28, 1920. In the fall semester of 1920, the college opened for classes. At that time, the Albany-focused Times Union stated that the "'sweeping lawns, a grove of pines, and a tennis court, make the site an ideal one for its new purpose.'" The Sisters of St. Joseph were responsible for the college; Rosina was named its first dean, while Edmund Gibbons was named its honorary president.

The college's founders selected its name to honor the first canonized saint in the Americas, Saint Rose of Lima. Initially, emphasis was placed on the professional training of teachers, but it quickly expanded to include preparation for business and other professions.

The college created an evening division in 1946 to serve World War II veterans. By 1950, the college opened a graduate school. The college became fully coeducational in the 1969-1970 academic year. In 1970, 10 laypersons were added to the board of trustees, and the college became an independent college that was sponsored by the Sisters of Saint Joseph of Carondelet but was no longer under the Sisters' control. Campus housing was made available to male students in the 1970s.

=== Financial challenges ===
Between 1999 and 2015, the college purchased 68 properties, tripling the size of its campus. These purchases cost $12 million. During the same period, the college spent an additional $100 million upgrading and improving the properties it acquired, taking on significant debt. Between 2008 and 2015, enrollment at the college decreased by 16 percent.

In December 2015, the college announced plans to eliminate 27 academic programs and 23 faculty positions. Two months later, the faculty of the college passed a "no confidence" motion in regard to college president Carolyn J. Stefanco. Also in 2016, the college announced its largest-ever incoming class of 658 students. An investigatory committee of the American Association of University Professors concluded that the college's layoffs "violated shared governance and undermined tenure and academic freedom" and "violated the association's principles and standards".

Stefanco left her post as president in 2020. That same year, the college made $8 million in administrative budget cuts to address a COVID pandemic-related budget gap. In December of that year, college leaders announced that they would eliminate 16 bachelor's degree programs, six master's degree programs, and three certificate programs as a cost-saving measure. In October 2022, the New York Supreme Court, Appellate Division dismissed a lawsuit filed by four professors who had been laid off by the college in 2020.

In June 2023, the college's accreditor, the Middle States Commission on Higher Education, warned the college that its accreditation was "in jeopardy" due to financial difficulties. The commission gave the college six months to address the commission's concerns. By October, Fitch Ratings assessed the school's bond rating as "BB", which is described as "non-investment grade speculative". In November, the college asked state lawmakers for emergency funding to avoid a closure.

=== Closure ===
On November 30, 2023, the board of trustees voted to close the College of Saint Rose following the end of the spring semester 2024. College president Marcia White stated that various challenges were affecting many small independent institutions of higher education, particularly in the Northeastern United States; according to White, those challenges included years of declining enrollment and the impact of the COVID-19 pandemic. Students protested the planned closure.

The college held its final commencement ceremony on May 11, 2024. The last day of instruction was June 21, 2024, with all operations scheduled to cease by the end of December 2024.

On October 10, 2024, the college filed for Chapter 11 bankruptcy protection. On March 13, 2025, the college's campus was sold to the Pine Hills Land Authority, a quasi-public entity created by Albany County, for $35 million. The former president's house was sold separately for $625,000.

The State University of New York at Albany became the official records custodian for the college after its closure.

In May 2026, the 150,000 books in the former college's library were put up for auction, including books dating back to the 1200s.

=== List of presidents ===
1. Edmund Gibbons (1920–1949)
2. Rose of Lima Dolan (1949–1953)
3. Catherine Francis Soulier (1953–1966)
4. Margaret Keeshan (1966–1970)
5. Alfonse R. Miele (1970–1972)
6. Thomas Manion (1973–1983)
7. Louis Vaccaro (1983–1996)
8. R. Mark Sullivan (1996–2012)
9. David Szczerbacki (2012–2013)
10. Carolyn J. Stefanco (2014–2020)
11. Marcia White (2020–2024)

== Campus ==
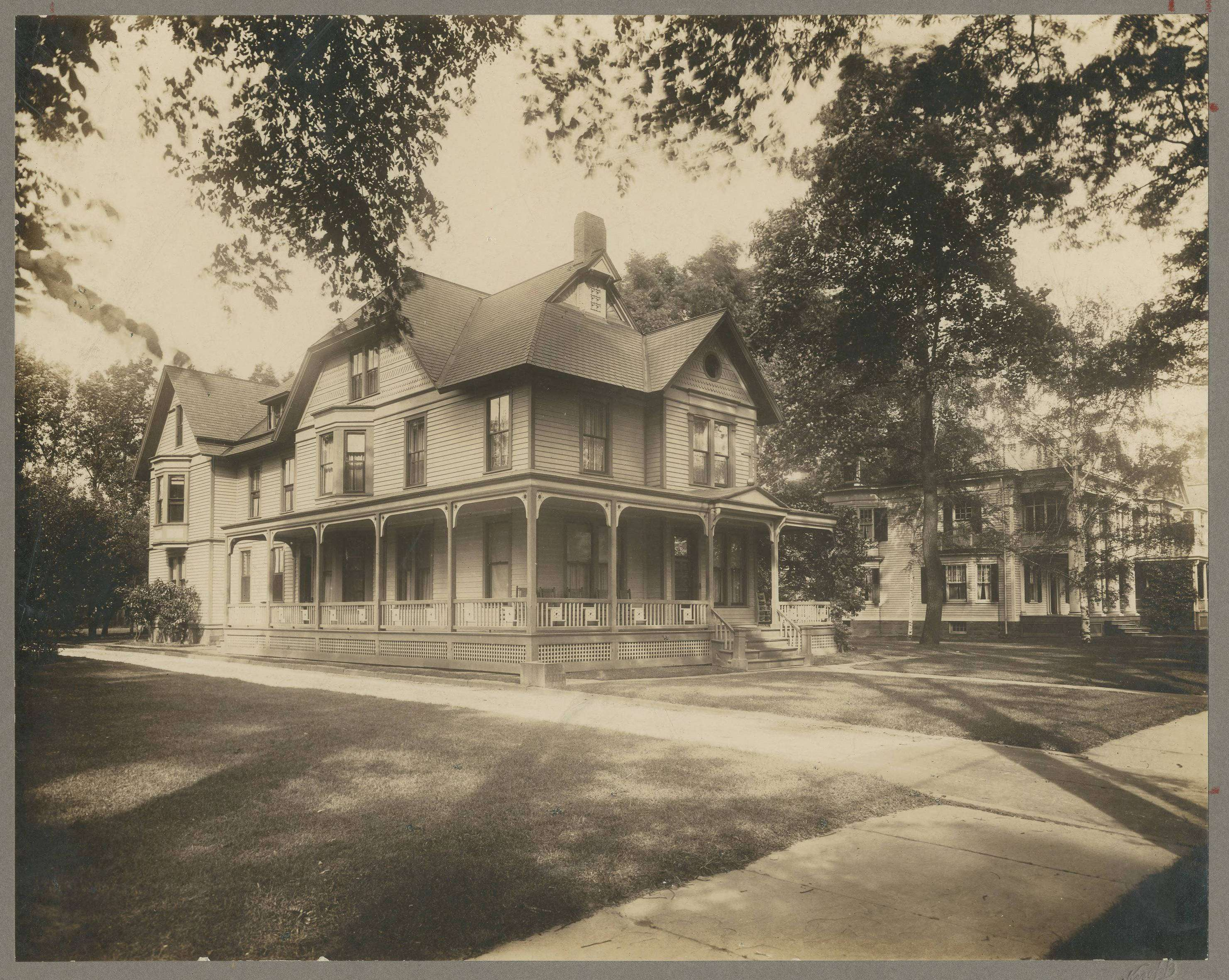
979 Madison Ave., now known as Moran Hall, was the first building acquired by the college.

The campus of The College of Saint Rose was located in the Pine Hills neighborhood of Albany, the capital city of New York. The 46-acre (19 ha) campus was bounded by Western Avenue to the north, Partridge Street to the east, Morris Street to the south, and Main Avenue to the west, and included additional properties north of Western Avenue and east of Partridge Street. Over the years, the college acquired many of the Victorian-era homes adjacent to the main campus. Many of these structures were converted into offices and student housing. The expansion of the college into the surrounding neighborhood occasionally led to conflict with local neighborhood and historic conservation associations.

St. Joseph Hall is a four-story English brick building with limestone trim fronted by six Corinthian columns. It is located at 985 Madison Avenue between the Science Center to the west and Moran Hall to the east. The structure was built in 1922 at a cost of US$500,000 (equivalent to $9,600,000 in 2025) due to a need for classroom and dining space to house the growing student body.

The Massry Center for the Arts features the Kathleen McManus Picotte Recital Hall, the Esther Massry Gallery, and the William Randolph Hearst Music Wing. This building served as the primary venue for concerts and exhibitions by the college's students and faculty, and as a performance and exhibition space for artists, musicians, vocalists, and orchestras. The Massry Center received an LEED gold award for being one of the most energy-efficient buildings in the Capital Region.

== Athletics ==
The College of Saint Rose was a Division II member of the National Collegiate Athletic Association (NCAA), offering 19 varsity intercollegiate sports at the NCAA Division II level. Shortly before 2000, Saint Rose became a member of the Northeast-10 Conference (NE-10). The school's primary colors were white and gold, but black and gold were the colors used for marketing purposes. The school's NCAA Division II sports teams were referred to as the Golden Knights. Controversy arose when the Vegas Golden Knights joined the National Hockey League in 2017. At that time, the college raised objections that led to the denial of Vegas's trademark application. Vegas's trademark application was later approved on appeal.

In 2009, the Saint Rose women's soccer became the third team in Northeast-10 Conference history (1985) to win three consecutive postseason league titles. The team's season record was 24–1, and it was ranked fourth in the United States at season's end.

=== Sports complex ===
The college's Christian Plumeri Sports Complex was constructed at a cost of $4.7 million. The college's funding for the complex included a $1 million challenge contribution from Joe Plumeri, chairman and CEO of Willis Group Holdings and the college's 2006 commencement speaker. The complex was named in honor of Plumeri's deceased son.

== Notable alumni ==
- Glen Barker, Major League Baseball player and scout
- Mary Daly, American radical feminist philosopher and theologian
- Paige DeSorbo, influencer and TV personality
- Jimmy Fallon, comedian, actor, and host of The Tonight Show. Left the college before graduating, but completed his Bachelor of Arts degree in 2009. Received an honorary Doctor of Humane Letters from the college that same year
- Marilee Jones, dean of admissions at MIT who resigned due to fabricating her academic background
- Christine Morrissey, Canadian LGBT activist and Order of Canada recipient.
- Elizabeth O'Connor Little, member of the New York State Senate
- Brian Patneaude, jazz saxophonist and band leader
- Loretta A. Preska, Chief Judge of the United States District Court for the Southern District of New York
- Robert Reilly, member of the New York State Assembly for the 109th district (master's degree)
- James Nicholas Tedisco, member of the New York State Senate and former New York State Assembly Minority Leader (2005-2009) (master's degree)
- Marcia White, president and executive director of the Saratoga Performing Arts Center and president of The College of Saint Rose

== See also ==
- List of defunct colleges and universities in New York
