= Arthur Britton Smith =

Canadian philanthropist and businessperson (1920–2023)

Arthur Britton Smith CM OOnt MC CD KC
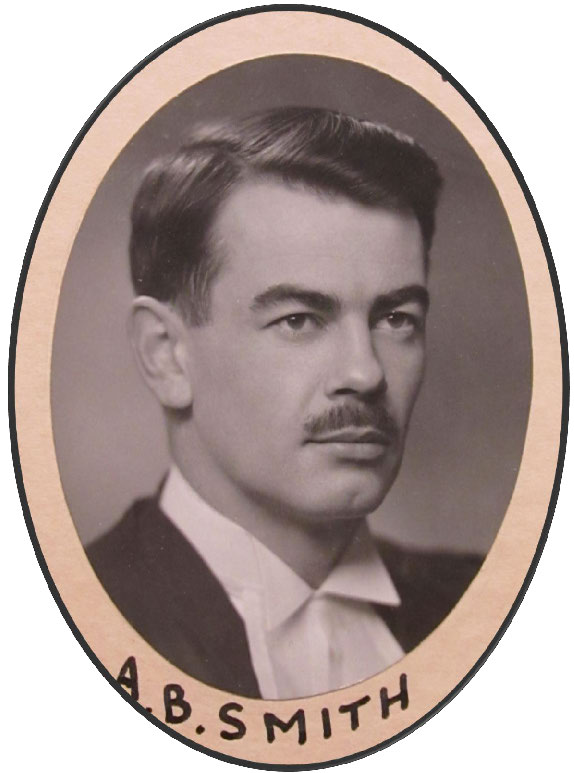
- Born: May 13, 1920; Kingston, Ontario, Canada
- Died: October 28, 2023 (aged 103); Kingston, Ontario, Canada
- Education: Royal Military College of Canada; Kingston Collegiate and Vocational Institute
- Occupations: Soldier, lawyer, businessperson
- Known for: Philanthropy, war veteran, businessperson
- Spouse: Sally Carruthers (m. 1944; died 2008)
- Children: 3

Arthur Britton Smith CM OOnt MC CD KC (May 13, 1920 – October 28, 2023) was a Canadian philanthropist, businessperson, historical writer, lawyer, and war veteran.

== Early life ==
Arthur Britton Smith was born in Kingston, Ontario on May 13, 1920, the son of Cyril Middleton Smith, a lawyer, and Edna Madeline Smith (née Spooner). Both his parents were originally from Manitoba. He and three sisters were raised in Kingston (plus one who died as a toddler), growing up on Stuart Street and Kensington Avenue. He received his primary and secondary education at Victoria Public School and Kingston Collegiate and Vocational Institute.

== Career ==
=== Military service ===
Smith first joined the army in 1935 when, as a 15-year-old schoolboy, he enlisted as a part-time reservist in the 32nd (Kingston) Field Battery, an artillery unit in the Non-Permanent Active Militia. In 1938, aged 18, he became a cadet (#2652) at the Royal Military College of Canada (RMC), located in his hometown of Kingston. Upon completing the program at RMC in 1940, he was commissioned as a lieutenant in the Royal Canadian Artillery (RCA), a corps of the Canadian Army. World War II was underway and that same year Smith was sent overseas to the United Kingdom, posted to the 8th Field Regiment, RCA. Smith later recalled that, as a young professional soldier, he was "delighted to have the opportunity to fight the war." In 1942, he was promoted to the rank of captain and transferred to the 4th Field Regiment, RCA.

In early July 1944, about a month after D-Day, Smith landed in Normandy, France, as part of the invasion follow-on forces. He was the commander of 'C' Troop, 14th Battery, 4th Field Regiment, RCA, which was part of the 2nd Canadian Infantry Division. His time in France was to be brief.

Smith's unit went to the front lines on the night of July 11. On July 20, Smith was artillery Forward Observation Officer (FOO) with a company of the Fusiliers Mont-Royal (FMR), a French-Canadian infantry unit, during fierce and bloody fighting in the area of Verrières, just south of Caen (it was standard practise for the artillery troop commanders to act as FOOs—to in effect lead from the front). After the FMR initially took Troteval Farm, Smith was behind a wall speaking with another officer when a hand grenade was tossed from the other side and exploded in between the two officers. It was a German "egg" grenade; the grande left Smith with only some minor cuts. Smith asked a nearby Canadian tank to knock a hole through the wall, which he then rushed through looking for the enemy who had thrown the grenade. A German soldier, armed with a "Schmeisser" submachine gun, suddenly appeared and fired a short burst at Smith, with two bullets hitting Smith in the chest. Smith however was wearing body armour—plates of densely moulded plastic that shielded the most vital areas of his torso—which the Canadian Army had issued to infantrymen and forward artillery personnel who were going to Normandy. The bullets left two indentations in Smith's chest plate, each about an inch deep, but he suffered only bruising.

During the remainder of that day and night and the following day, enemy armour and infantry (including elements of the 12th SS Panzer Division) mounted no fewer than four counter-attacks on the farm. To accurately direct the guns, he several times had to move to exposed positions in the face of heavy enemy fire. On one occasion, he and the few soldiers in his Observation Post killed several enemy troops who had gotten within 20 yards of their position. In a final German counter-attack on the farm, the FMR company—now critically low on ammunition—was overrun. Smith then withdrew under heavy fire and avoided being captured. Smith was later awarded the Military Cross. A few days later, on July 24, 1944, another company from the FMR, under Major J.A. Dextraze, seized Troteval Farm and held it.

On the morning of July 25, Smith was a FOO with the Royal Hamilton Light Infantry during an attack on Verriéres village. As he advanced through a grain field, in dim pre-dawn light, his Universal Carrier—a small, light-tracked armoured vehicle commonly called a "Bren gun carrier"—detonated a German anti-tank mine. Smith's driver was instantly killed. Despite a lining of sandbags in the bottom of the Carrier, Smith's right leg was badly shattered and he was thrown high into the air and out of the vehicle. At least four enemy machine guns began firing at the area where the flash of the exploding mine had been seen. Smith and his two signallers crawled away through the grain field, with machine gun bullets being shot all around. One of the bullets ricocheted off the ground and hit Smith in the side of his head, embedding itself behind his right ear. Smith was evacuated from the war zone and ultimately repatriated to Canada in November 1944.

After spending several months in hospitals in France, the UK and Canada, Smith began a staff job at Kingston. In relatively short order, as a result of the lingering effects of his injuries, he was medically discharged from the army. Years later Smith speculated that he may be lucky to have been wounded, as the chances were high that he would have been killed had he remained in action.

In addition to having won the Military Cross for gallantry, Smith received several service medals to recognize his war service: the 1939–1945 Star; the France and Germany Star; the Defence Medal; the Canadian Volunteer Service Medal with overseas bar; and the War Medal 1939–1945. In 2014, the 70th anniversary of the Battle of Normandy, Smith's wartime service was further recognized when France awarded him its ordre national de la Légion d'honneur (National Order of the Legion of Honour).

Following the war, in 1948, Smith joined an infantry reserve unit in Kingston, the Princess of Wales' Own Regiment (PWOR), in which he served as a company commander until 1954. He later served as the PWOR's Honorary Lieutenant-Colonel from 1968 to 1974, as the Honorary Colonel from 1974 to 1985 and again from 1992 to 1995.

=== Legal career ===
Following his service in World War II, Smith in 1945 began to work toward becoming a lawyer. In Ontario at that time, prospective lawyers went through a three-year bar admission process, involving "articling" (in effect, apprenticing) at a law firm while also taking some courses part-time at Osgoode Hall Law School in Toronto. Smith completed this process in 1948 and was admitted to Ontario's legal profession as a barrister and solicitor. Several years later, he was granted a Bachelor of Laws (LL.B.) degree; this degree was retroactively offered in 1991 to persons who had graduated from Osgoode Hall Law School in the years before it became a degree-granting institution. After becoming a lawyer in 1948, Smith established a law office in Kingston and practised for 50 years.

=== Real estate career ===
Early in his legal career, Smith began to dabble as a hobby in residential development and rentals. In 1954, Smith founded Homestead Land Holdings Limited, a land development, construction and residential rental company. Smith built Homestead into one of the largest residential rental companies in all of Canada, ultimately owning and marketing over 27,000 rental units in 16 cities across eastern, central and western Ontario and in Calgary, Alberta.

== Historical writing ==
Smith produced two books and a journal article, all on historical subjects.

== Community service and philanthropy ==
Smith had a recognized record of community service and philanthropy. The award of the Order of Ontario (2018) to Smith was in recognition of his community service, including his philanthropy. Similarly, community service and philanthropy figured prominently in Smith being made a Member of the Order of Canada in 2019. The citation for this award reads:

Throughout his lifetime, Britton Smith has demonstrated exemplary qualities of leadership and vision. A native of Kingston, Ontario, he practiced law before developing one of the most successful rental organizations in the country. Esteemed for his philanthropy, he has helped grow his community through generous donations from his eponymous foundation, benefiting the social, economic and cultural fabric of the city. A decorated Second World War soldier and recipient of the Military Cross, he is also a passionate local historian and has written extensively on HMS Ontario, a military brig lost in 1780.

=== Community service ===
Smith held a number of community appointments along with his work. The following is a partial list of Smith's volunteer and community service:

- Honorary Colonel, The Princess of Wales’ Own Regiment, 1974–85 and 1992–95
- President of The Royal Military College Club of Canada, 1983–84
- Executive member of The Royal Military College Club of Canada, 1957–83
- Honorary Lieutenant-Colonel, The Princess of Wales' Own Regiment, 1968–74
- Chairman of Kingston's United Way charitable fundraising campaign, 1967
- Alderman (i.e. elected councillor) on Kingston City Council, serving for three terms, 1949–55

=== Philanthropy ===
Smith, personally as well as through his charitable foundation (the Britton Smith Foundation) and his closely held corporation (Homestead Land Holdings Limited), donated money to numerous charities and community projects.

- A gift of $3.2 million was made to the Marine Museum of the Great Lakes in 2019 to enable it to purchase a site on the waterfront in downtown Kingston.
- A $10,000 matching donation was made to the 2019 annual campaign of the Seniors Association Kingston Region.
- A donation of $300,000 was made to Nanny Angel Network.
- A gift of $4.5 million in 2018 to Hospice Kingston toward the building of a hospice residence and palliative care centre was made.
- A gift of $5 million was made to the University Hospitals Kingston Foundation in 2018 toward building a new Providence Manor long-term care facility in Kingston.
- A gift to the University Hospitals Kingston Foundation was made in 2018 to support the purchase of a robot-assisted surgical system for the Kingston Health Sciences Centre.
- A gift in 2017–18 to fund, through the RMC Foundation, the purchase of 1400 "Universal Pattern" pith helmets for the Royal Military College of Canada and the Collège militaire royal de Saint-Jean, enabling the Colleges to return to the tradition of every cadet wearing such a helmet at full-dress ceremonial parades.
- Donations totaling more than $1 million to the RMC Foundation to support activities beyond the mandate of the Canadian Armed Forces at the Canadian Military Colleges.
- A gift of $1.125 million was made to the Canadian National Institute for the Blind in 2017 to support various projects including work on the recreation hall at the CNIB's Lake Joseph Centre (an accessible camp in Muskoka, Ontario), the redevelopment of CNIB facilities in Kingston and Ottawa and new programs in eastern Ontario.
- A gift of $700,000 in 2017 to support the Boys and Girls Club of Kingston & Area.
- A gift of $10 million to Queen's University in 2014. Of this, $4.5 million was for the School of Nursing, $4.5 million for the Department of Surgery and $1 million for upgrading Richardson Stadium.
- A gift of $3 million in 2016 to St. Lawrence College.
- A gift of $1.2 million in 2016 through the United Way.
- A gift of $3 million was made to the University Hospitals Kingston Foundation in 2015 toward the purchase of a second magnetic resonance imaging (MRI) machine for the Kingston General Hospital site of Kingston Health Sciences Centre.
- A donation of $2 million in 2007 to the University Hospitals Kingston Foundation to support the redevelopment of Hotel Dieu Hospital, Kingston General Hospital and Providence Continuing Care Centre.
- A gift of $200,000 in 2007 to the campaign to raise funds to build a civic sports and entertainment centre in Kingston.
- He constructed, through his company, Homestead Land Holdings Limited, in 1979, a new entranceway to the grounds of the Royal Military College of Canada and donated much of the cost of the project.

== Personal life ==
In 1944, a few days after arriving home from the war and while still recovering from his wounds, Smith married his fiancée of four years, Edith Burpee (“Sally”) Carruthers of Kingston. They raised three children: Sheila, Britton and Alexander. The couple was together for 68 years before Sally died of cancer in 2012.

Over the years, Smith's hobbies and pastimes included boating, hunting, fishing, tennis, horseback riding, breeding Arabian horses, raising Aberdeen cattle, and collecting old books.

Smith turned 100 in May 2020 and died in Kingston on October 28, 2023, at the age of 103.

== List of honours and awards ==
=== Orders, decorations and medals ===
- Member of the Order of Canada (CM) (2019), awarded to Smith for his leadership
- Order of Ontario (OOnt) (2018), awarded to Smith for his community service
- Military Cross (MC) (1944), for his action against the enemy
- 1939–1945 Star
- France and Germany Star
- Defence Medal
- Canadian Volunteer Service Medal, with overseas bar
- War Medal 1939–1945
- 125th Anniversary of the Confederation of Canada Medal (1992)
- Queen Elizabeth II Diamond Jubilee Medal (2012)
- Efficiency Medal
- Canadian Forces' Decoration (CD), with one clasp
- Chevalier dans l'Ordre national de la Légion d'honneur (France) (2014)

=== Other honours and awards ===
- Queen's Counsel (QC) (Ontario) (1958)
- Honorary degree of Doctor of Laws (LL.D.), Royal Military College of Canada (1989)
- Honorary degree of Doctor of Laws (LL.D.), Queen's University, Kingston, Ontario (2009)
- Wall of Honour, Royal Military College of Canada (2017)
- Honorary President, Royal Military Colleges Club of Canada (2015).
- Honorary Colonel's Commendation, The Princess of Wales' Regiment.
- Lifetime Honorary Membership in the Royal Military Colleges Club of Canada (2009).
- Honorary Patron of the United Way of Kingston, Frontenac, Lennox and Addington
- Kingston Business Hall of Fame (2006) (inaugural inductee)
- Jim Bennett Award, Queen's University Alumni Association (2003)
- Paul Harris Fellow, Rotary Club of Kingston (1993)
- Kingston Chamber of Commerce's Business Person of the Year (1990)
