= Marilee Jones =

American writer

- Education: B.S. 1973, The College of Saint Rose
- Occupations: Author; college admissions consultant
- Children: Nora

Marilee Jones is an American author, college admissions consultant, and former college administrator. Jones is the co-author of Less Stress, More Success: A New Approach to Guiding Your Teen Through College Admissions and Beyond (2006).

In 2007, Jones resigned her position as director of admissions at Massachusetts Institute of Technology after it became known that she had fabricated her academic background. She later opened a consulting firm and worked in college counseling.

== Career ==
Jones was hired by the Massachusetts Institute of Technology (MIT) as an admissions officer in 1979. She was later promoted to associate director of admissions. She then served as interim dean of admissions from May 1997 until January 1998, when she was appointed to the position of dean of admissions.

In 2006, Jones and pediatrician Kenneth R. Ginsburg published Less Stress, More Success: A New Approach to Guiding Your Teen Through College Admissions and Beyond, a guide to the college admissions process. The book was profiled by The New York Times and The Boston Globe.

Jones resigned from her position at MIT on April 23, 2007 after it was revealed that she had falsely claimed that she held academic degrees from Union College and Rensselaer Polytechnic Institute on her 1979 job application to MIT and had added a fabricated degree from Albany Medical College to her resume sometime thereafter. Jones issued a statement on the MIT website admitting that she had falsified her academic background. The Times characterized Jones's earlier fame as "the guru of the movement to tame the college-admissions frenzy". The Boston Globe called her "the most celebrated and outspoken admissions dean in America". After her resignation, Jones became the number two newsmaker of the day on Countdown with Keith Olbermann for "begging college applicants not to pad their resumes" while having done so herself. On May 2, 2007, it was reported that she had actually earned a bachelor's degree in biology from The College of Saint Rose in 1973, though she did not list that degree when applying for her first job at MIT or when being considered for subsequent promotions.

After her departure from MIT, Jones created a consulting firm that provides college admissions advice to institutions and applicants. Since 2015, she has worked at the Princeton International School of Mathematics and Science and is currently the dean of college counseling.

== Personal ==
Jones has a daughter.
