= Sources of law =

Origin of rules regulating human conduct

Sources of law are the origins of laws, the binding rules that enable any state to govern its territory. The terminology was already used in Rome by Cicero as a metaphor referring to the "fountain" ("fons" in Latin) of law. Technically, anything that can create, change, or cancel any right or law is considered a source of law.

The term "source of law" may sometimes refer to the sovereign or to the seat of power from which the law derives its validity.

Legal theory usually classifies them into formal and material sources, although this classification is not always used consistently. Normally, formal sources are connected with what creates the law: statutes, case law, contracts, and so on. In contrast, material sources refer to the places where formal law can be found, such as the official bulletin or gazette where the legislator publishes the country's laws, newspapers, and public deeds. Following the Aristotelian notion of the four causes (material, formal, efficient, and final causes), Riofrio also develops additional potential sources of law. For instance, efficient sources of law would include actions of nature or "of God" that change the law, actions of the intellect that produce legal culture, and actions of the will that approve laws and agreements. On the other hand, several final sources of law exist, such as the purposes of law, the intentions of the parties in a legal transaction, the goals of each policy, and the ends of the constitution.

== Jurisprudence ==
The perceived authenticity of a source of law may rely on a choice of jurisprudence analysis. Tyrants such as Kim Jong-un may wield De facto power, (Note: Austin's "command theory of law" asserts that to be effective, law must have a sovereign and a sanction to back it up.) but critics would say he does not exercise power from a de jure (or legitimate) source. After WWII it was not a valid defence at Nuremberg to say "I was only obeying orders", and the victors hanged Nazis for breaching "universal and eternal standards of right and wrong".

Over decades and centuries, principles of law have been derived from customs. The divine right of kings, natural and legal rights, human rights, civil rights, and common law are early unwritten sources of law. Historical or judicial precedent and case law can modify or even create a source of law. Legislation, rules, and regulations form the tangible source of laws which are codified and enforceable.

== Sources in different legal systems ==
Different legal systems of the world.

In civil law systems, the sources of law include the legal codes, such as the civil code or the criminal code, and custom; (Note: For example, in Louisiana Civil Code art. 1, the sources of law are custom and legislation.) in common law systems there are also several sources that combine to form "the law". Civil law systems often absorb ideas from the common law (Note: For instance , the ECJ is a civil court that embraces binding precedent) and vice-versa. Scotland, for instance, has a hybrid form of law, as does South Africa, whose law in an amalgam of common law, civil law and tribal law.

A state may comply with international law, it may have a written or federal constitution, or it may have regional legislature, but normally it is the central national legislature that is the ultimate source of law. While a written constitution may seem to be the prime source of law, the state legislature may amend its constitution provided certain rules are followed. International law may take precedence over national law, but international law is mainly made up of conventions and treaties that have been ratified; and anything that can be ratified may be denounced later by the national parliament. (Note: The UK is (in 2018) taking steps to denounce European Law) Although local authorities may feel that they have a democratic mandate to pass by-laws, the legislative power they wield has been delegated by parliament; and what parliament gives, parliament make later take away. (Note: The UK ’s Westminster Parliament can, for instance, suspend at will Northern Ireland’s Assembly at Stormont)

In England, the archetypal common law country, there is a hierarchy of sources, as follows:

- Legislation (primary and secondary)
- The case law rules of common law and equity
- Parliamentary conventions
- General customs
- Books of authority

Canon law and other forms of religious law form the basis for law derived from religious practices and doctrines or from sacred texts; this source of law is important where there is a state religion.

== International sources ==
=== International treaties ===
Governments may sign International Conventions and Treaties; but these normally become binding only when they are ratified. Most conventions come into force only when a stated number of signatories have ratified the final text. An international convention may be incorporated into a statute (e.g. Hague–Visby Rules in Carriage of Goods by Sea Act 1971; e.g. the Salvage Convention in the Merchant Shipping Act 1995). The Council of Europe’s European Convention on Human Rights is enforced by the European Court of Human Rights in Strasbourg.

=== European Union law ===
The European Union is special example of international law. European nations that join the EU thereby adopt all EC Law to date (the acquis communautaire), namely: treaty provisions, regulations, directives, decisions, and precedents. Member States become subject to "Brussels" and to the binding precedent decisions of the Court of Justice of the European Union (or CJEU) in Luxembourg. However, Brussels may only act and legislate in accordance with the EU treaties, and the CJEU's supremacy applies only in matters of EU law.

== National sources ==
=== Legislation ===
Legislation is the prime source of law and consists in the declaration of legal rules by a competent authority. Legislation can have many purposes: to regulate, to authorize, to enable, to proscribe, to provide funds, to sanction, to grant, to declare or to restrict. A parliamentary legislature frames new laws, such as acts of Parliament, and amends or repeals old laws. The legislature may delegate law-making powers to lower bodies. In the UK, such delegated legislation includes statutory instruments, Orders in Council, and bye-laws. Delegated legislation may be open to challenge for irregularity of process; and the legislature usually has the right to withdraw delegated powers if it sees fit.

Most legislatures have their powers restricted by the nation's constitution, and Montesquieu's theory of the separation of powers typically restricts a legislature's powers to legislation. Although the legislature has the power to legislate, it is the courts who have the power to interpret statutes, treaties and regulations. Similarly, although parliaments have the power to legislate, it is usually the executive who decides on the legislative programmed. The procedure is usually that a bill is introduced to Parliament, and after the required number of readings, committee stages and amendments, the bill gains approval and becomes an act.

=== Case law ===
Judicial precedent (aka: case law, or judge-made law) is based on the doctrine of stare decisis, and mostly associated with jurisdictions based on the English common law, but the concept has been adopted in part by Civil Law systems. Precedent is the accumulated principles of law derived from centuries of decisions. Judgments passed by judges in important cases are recorded and become significant source of law. When there is no legislature on a particular point which arises in changing conditions, the judges depend on their own sense of right and wrong and decide the disputes from first principles. Authoritative precedent decisions become a guide in subsequent cases of a similar nature. The dictionary of English law defines a judicial precedent as a judgment or decision of a court of law cited as an authority for deciding a similar state of fact in the same manner or on the same principle or by analogy. Another definition declares precedent to be," a decision in a court of justice cited in support of a proposition for which it is desired to contend".

Compared to other sources of law, precedent has the advantage of flexibility and adaptability, and may enable a judge to apply "justice" rather than "the law".

=== Equity ===
Equity is a source of law peculiar to England and Wales. Equity is the case law developed by the (now defunct) Court of Chancery. Equity prevails over common law, but its application is discretionary. Equity's main achievements are: trusts, charities, probate, and equitable remedies. There are a number of equitable maxims, such as: "He who comes to equity must come with clean hands".

=== Parliamentary conventions ===
Parliamentary conventions are not strict rules of law, but their breach may lead to breach of law. They typically are found within the English legal system, and they help compensate for the UK's lack of a single written constitution. Typically, parliamentary conventions govern relationships, such as that between the House of Lords and the House of Commons; between the monarch and Parliament; and between Britain and its colonies. For instance, after the Finance Act 1909, the House of Lords lost its power to obstruct the passage of bills, and now may only delay them. The prerogative powers are subject to convention, and in 2010, the monarch's power to dissolve Parliament was abolished. Britain's tradition with its colonies is that they are self-governing (although, historically, rarely with universal suffrage), and that the mother-country should stay aloof.

=== Customs ===
A "general custom" as a source of law is not normally written, but if a practice can be shown to have existed for a very long time, such as "since time immemorial" (1189 AD), it becomes a source of law.

A "particular custom" (or "private custom") may arise and become a right with the force of law when a person, or a group of persons has from long usage obtained a recognized usage, such as an easement.

=== Books of authority ===
Up until the 20th century, English judges felt able to examine certain "books of authority" for guidance, and both Coke and Blackstone were frequently cited. This old practice of citing only authors who are dead has gone; nowadays notable legal authors may be cited, even if they are still alive.

== See also ==
- Jurisprudence
- Legitimacy
- Legal socialization
- Opinio juris sive necessitatis
- Sources of international law
