= LEGIT =

Canadian LGBT+ immigration organization

LEGIT (Lesbian and Gay Immigration Task Force) is a Canadian organization founded in 1991 that advocates for lesbian, gay, bisexual, and transsexual immigration equality and provides immigration information to same-sex couples. LEGIT was part of high-profile legal challenges pushing Canada to allow immigration of same-sex partners.

== History ==
LEGIT was founded in December 1991 in Vancouver as a grassroots lobbying group by a group of Canadians who had non-Canadian partners, including Christine Morrissey and Douglas Saunders, a law professor. The group led some of the first legal challenges to Canada's immigration laws related to same sex relationships, including a legal challenge to the denial of the immigration application of an Irish-American woman in a relationship with Canadian Christine Morrissey. The legal challenges in the early 1990s argued that individuals were being discriminated against on the basis of their sexual orientation, in contradiction to Canada's Charter or Rights and Freedoms.

In the early 2000s, LEGIT representatives advocated for same-sex inclusive immigration laws in policy creation proceedings, contributing to Canada expanding its immigration laws to be inclusive of lesbian and gay family immigration.
