= Marcia White =

American executive

Marcia White is an American executive. White served as president and executive director of the Saratoga Performing Arts Center (SPAC), a music venue located on the grounds of Saratoga Spa State Park in Saratoga Springs, New York, from 2005 to 2016. In 2020, she was hired as interim president, and then appointed permanent president in 2021, of the College of Saint Rose in Albany, New York, until the college closed in 2024.

== Education ==
White received a bachelor's degree from the College of Saint Rose.

== Career ==
White was an aide to longtime New York State Senator Joe Bruno for nearly two decades. White worked on health care issues and served as Bruno's press secretary. White also helped initiate Generating Employment, a New York science program.

White was the president of Marcia White Consulting LLC.

=== Saratoga Performing Arts Center (SPAC) ===
White became the executive director of SPAC in 2005. In 2006, she secured $2.1 million in New York State funds to rehabilitate the venue. Her twin goals were to raise money and to increase SPAC's profile as a cultural and concert venue. She continued the New York City Ballet summer residency at SPAC, which had experienced declining attendance through 2005. White also created a new logo and web presence for SPAC. In 2008, White focused on promoting the Philadelphia Orchestra summer residency at SPAC, introducing performers such as pianist Yuja Wang.

During her tenure as executive director, White served on a transition team for New York Governor Eliot Spitzer.

White retired from SPAC in 2016. According to the Albany Times Union, under White's leadership, "the nonprofit emerged from a decade and half of red ink to finish each year in the black".

=== The College of Saint Rose ===
In 2020, White was named interim president of her alma mater, the College of Saint Rose. She was then appointed permanently to that position in 2021. White had previously served on the college's board of trustees for 18 years. The college had previously honored White with a Community of Excellence award in 2016 for her contributions to the college and to the Capital District.

In November 2023, the media announced that the College of Saint Rose would be closing at the end of the 2023–2024 academic year. She attempted to find a merger partner for the college, but ultimately those negotiations fell through.

== See also ==
- Joe Bruno
- Saratoga Performing Arts Center (SPAC)
