= Christine Morrissey =

Canadian LGBT activist

Christine Mary Morrissey OC
- Born: December 27, 1942; Leicester, England
- Died: April 14, 2025 (aged 82)
- Citizenship: Canada
- Education: College of St. Rose
- Organization: Rainbow Refugee
- Known for: LGBT Activism
- Partner: Bridget Coll
- Awards: Order of Canada; Queen Elizabeth II Diamond Jubilee Medal

Christine Morrissey (December 27, 1942 – April 14, 2025) was a Canadian LGBT activist and community organiser based in Vancouver, British Columbia. Born in Leicester, England, she emigrated to Canada as a child and later served as a Franciscan nun in Malaysia and Chile. After settling in Vancouver, Morrissey became known for her work on immigration rights for same-sex couples and LGBT refugees. In the early 1990s, she and her partner, Bridget Coll, challenged Canadian immigration rules that did not recognize same-sex partners under the family class. She was appointed an Officer of the Order of Canada in 2019.

== Early life and religious work ==
Christine Mary Morrissey was born on December 27, 1942, in Leicester, England. In 1951, when she was eight years old, she moved with her family to Prince George, British Columbia, where her uncle and his family lived. Morrissey and Coll later said that the move reflected family concerns about communism in postwar Europe.

At sixteen, Morrissey became a Franciscan nun and moved to Albany, New York, to attend the College of St. Rose. While in Albany, she met Bridget Coll, who was also a nun. Morrissey completed her teaching degree in 1967 and was assigned to Malaysia, where she taught Bible study, English, and English literature.

In 1981, Morrissey and Coll asked to be moved to a convent in Chile. While there, Morrissey became involved in opposition to the Pinochet dictatorship, including by carrying messages for resistance members. She was also active in Movimiento contra la tortura, an organization opposed to torture under the dictatorship. Morrissey and Coll left religious life in 1988, and moved to Vancouver, British Columbia, the following year.

== Immigration challenge ==
After leaving Chile, Morrissey attempted to bring Bridget Coll, her partner of 14 years to Canada in 1990. After two and a half years, Morrissey attempted to sponsor her partner's immigration application, which was rejected, as their relationship was not considered to fall within the "family class" category, which was limited to heterosexual relationships. On January 14, 1992, Morrissey and Coll held a press conference with member of parliament Dawn Black announcing their lawsuit. Their case challenged Canada's immigration laws and brought a constitutional challenge before the courts. Their case rested on Morrissey's equality rights, which were guaranteed under the Canadian Charter of Rights and Freedoms, arguing that her partner's rejection constituted unlawful discrimination, on the basis of sexual orientation. In February 1992 a second Charter challenge on the "family class" issue was raised by another lesbian couple Carrott and Underwood.

In October 1992, Morrissey's partner's immigration application was granted under the independent immigrant category, allowing her to remain in the country. With the government settling the case without a ruling it allowed a ruling on the issue to be dropped. The lawyer for Morrissey and Coll later stated after the case was dismissed that this was "the federal government's way of sidestepping the messy issue." In June of 1994, Immigration Canada issued telex ORDO150 to its embassies and consulates aboard, giving programme managers discretion to allow same-sex partners to immigrate to Canada in cases where "undue hardship could result from separation". Administrative changes such as these were gradual steps towards equality that cases like Morrissey's had created. The significance of the case was that the Canadian government admitted they were unable to win the case and that undue discrimination was occurring because of immigration legislation.

Canada's Immigration and Refugee Protection Act was later amended in 2001, updating the country's immigration laws to formally recognize same-sex partners as members of the family class. This change to the law was one that Morrissey and other community members had advocated for in the years after her Coll had been granted entry into Canada.

== Later life ==
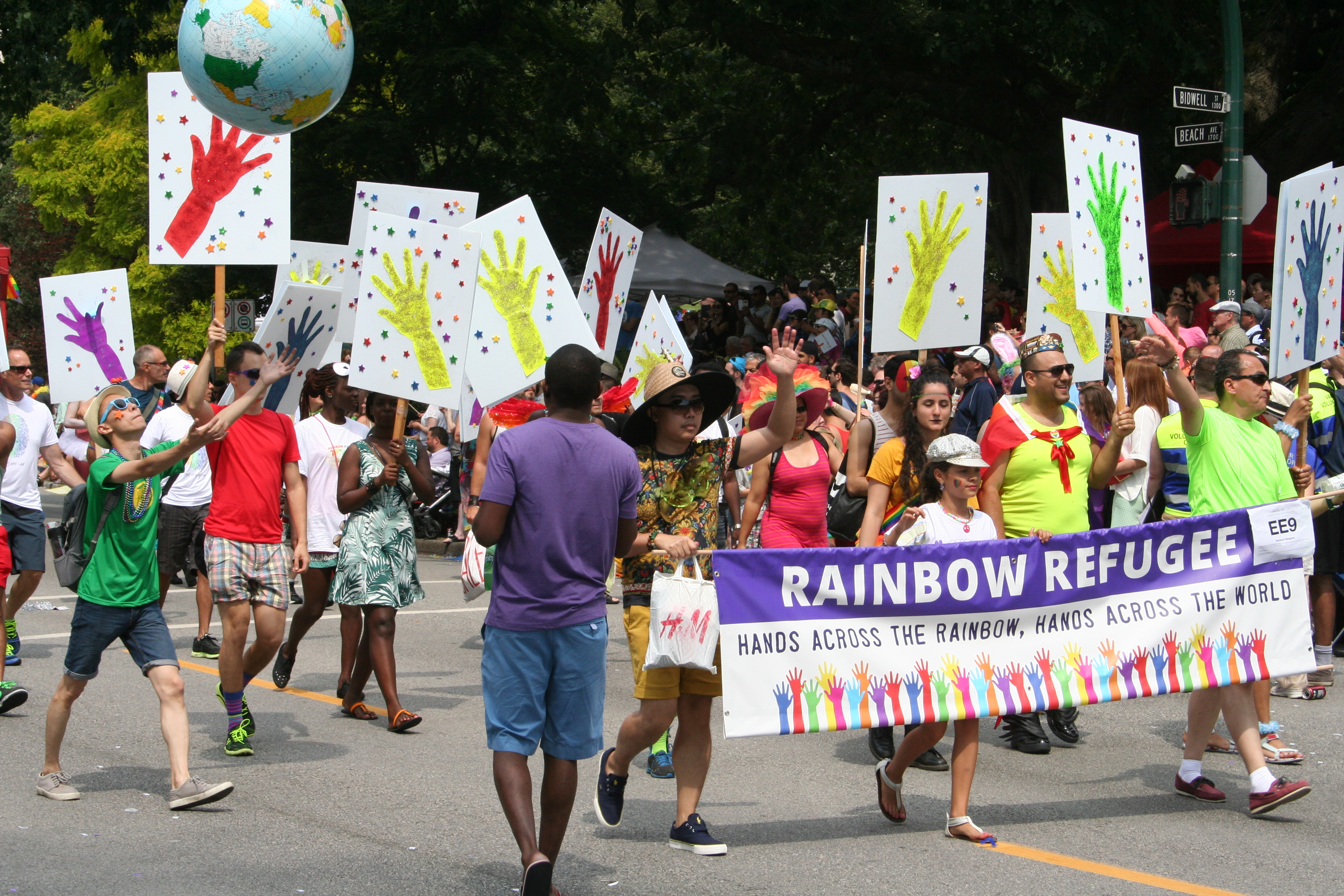
Rainbow Refugee at the Vancouver LGBTQ Pride 2015

Morrissey was an active member of the LGBT community throughout her life. Part of this work included her co-founding Lesbian and Gay Immigration Taskforce (LEGIT) in Vancouver to help same-sex couples of different nationalities navigate the immigration process to enable their cohabitation within Canada. LEGIT was one of the first organisations to challenge Canada's immigration laws on behalf of same sex couples. In addition to her work with LEGIT, Morrissey also founded Rainbow Refugee along with Sharalyn Jordan. The organisation she founded works to support individuals who identify as LGBT and are fleeing persecution in their home countries on the basis of their sexual orientation, gender identity, or HIV status, helping them navigate the resettlement process and rebuild their lives in Canada.

Canada has a vital role to play as a place of relative safety and respect for those who need to flee sexual orientation, gender or HIV based persecution.

— Christine Morrissey, Immigration, Refugees, and Citizenship Canada 2017

In 1999 both Morrissey and Coll were selected to serve as the grand marshals for the Vancouver pride parade in recognition for their advocacy. As part the Diamond Jubilee of Elizabeth II in 2012 Morrissey was awarded the Queen Elizabeth II Diamond Jubilee Medal. Morrissey later received the Vancouver Pride Society's Legacy Award in 2014, honouring decades of public service and community leadership in the Canadian LGBT community. In 2022, Morrissey took part in a pride campaign with IKEA Canada, lending her voice to highlight the importance of creating safe and welcoming spaces for meaningful LGBTQ+ advocacy, visibility, and representation. On November 22, 2019 the Governor General of Canada announced that Morrissey was appointed an Officer of the Order of Canada in recognition of her advocacy and work on behalf of 2SLGBTQ+ immigrants and refugees. She was formally invested on October 26, 2023 the Governor General's citation credits her with supporting "supported refugees who faced discrimination in their home countries because of sexual orientation or gender identity".

After her partner, Coll, was diagnosed with dementia, Morrissey became one of the few paid advocates in Canada focused on advocating for long-term health care for LGBT people. Her work included advocating for housing security and organizing supportive care groups. She also worked to provide trainings for long term care facilities and their provider staff on the unique needs and experiences of LGBT people under their care. Her partner Bridget passed away in 2017 due to complications from dementia.

Morrissey died on April 14, 2025 at the age of 82 surrounded by her chosen family. Until her final days, she remained deeply dedicated to supporting immigrants, the LGBTQ+ community, and other marginalised groups through her tireless advocacy and community work in Vancouver. The City of Vancouver declared July 22, 2025 as Chris Morrissey Day in honour of her work and memory of her passing.
