= Jeremy Pinnell =

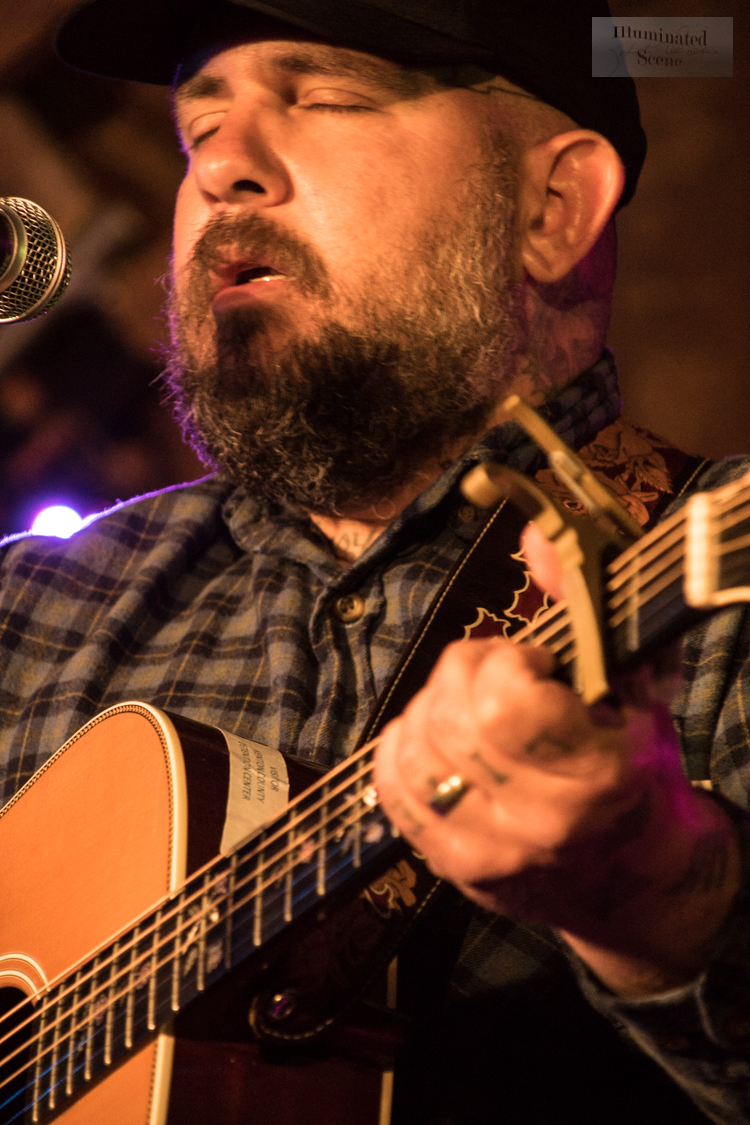

Background information
- Origin: Southgate, Kentucky
- Genre: Country
- Years active: 2014–present
- Label: SofaBurn Records
- Website: www.jeremypinnell.com

Jeremy Pinnell is an American country artist from Elsmere, Kentucky.

== Career ==
Pinnell released his first full-length album in 2014 titled OH/KY on SofaBurn Records. Pinnell released his second full-length album in 2017 titled Ties of Blood and Affection. He released the single Joey on January 15, 2021. This cover of the Concrete Blonde classic written by Johnette Napolitano is a stand-alone single leading up to his 3rd full-length release, Goodbye L.A., released on SofaBurn Records on October 1, 2021.

== Discography ==
Studio albums

- OH/KY (2014, SofaBurn)
- Ties of Blood and Affection (2017, SofaBurn)
- Goodbye L.A. (released October 1, 2021, SofaBurn)
- Decades (released October 31, 2025, SofaBurn)

Singles

- I Don't Believe (Live from Candyland) (2019, SofaBurn)
- Joey (2021, SofaBurn)
- Wanna Do Something (2021, SofaBurn)
- Night Time Eagle (2021, SofaBurn)
- Big Ol' Good (2021, SofaBurn)
