= Rick VanMatre =

- Genres: Jazz; Classical Music
- Occupations: Saxophonist; Composer; Conductor; Educator
- Instruments: Saxophone; Clarinet; Flute
- Website: http://rickvanmatre.com/

Rick VanMatre is an American saxophonist, composer, conductor and educator. As a musician, he has performed as a soloist with the New York Repertory Orchestra and the Cincinnati Chamber Orchestra, and recorded with the Cincinnati Pops Orchestra and PsychoAcoustic Orchestra. VanMatre has produced numerous albums, including Serenade in Blue and currently performs as the leader of the Rick VanMatre Quintet.

== Career ==
During his career, VanMatre has performed internationally in places such as the United States, Poland, Israel, France, Germany, and China. VanMatre has also produced four albums for Sea Breeze Records as conductor of the UC-CCM Jazz Ensemble including Serenade in Blue.

VanMatre is a professor at the University of Cincinnati – College-Conservatory of Music where he teaches Saxophone and Jazz Studies as an adjunct professor emeritus. He had previously served as the Director of Jazz Studies, retiring after 30 years, during which time he established a Jazz Recording Studio as well as additional degree programs (expanded BM in Jazz, created MM in Jazz Studies, and created DMA in Saxophone). During his tenure as Director he also headed the Visiting Artist Series at the Conservatory for which he conducted big band performances featuring artists such as Kenny Garrett, Joe Henderson, Ahmad Jamal, and Joshua Redman. While teaching at the Conservatory, VanMatre received the Ernest N. Glover Outstanding Teacher Award and was also named Ohio Educator of the Year by the National Association of Jazz Educators.

VanMatre has performed as a classical saxophonist with the Illinois Philharmonic Orchestra, Middletown Symphony, the Cincinnati Symphony Orchestra, and on the Linton Chamber Music Series. He also served as an on-air host and interviewer for Jazz – Live From the Hyatt, a nationally syndicated radio series on WGUC-FM.

VanMatre has taught and lectured on performances for the World Saxophone Congress, the North American Saxophone Alliance, and the Jamey Aebersold Summer Jazz Clinics. He served as Executive Board Member for the North American Saxophone Alliance where he was also a Jazz Coordinator. He has also written for the Saxophone Journal.

== Select discography ==
=== Albums / CDs ===
Year	Album	Credits / Notes
2013	Lines Above	Producer and Composer. CD recording by the Rick VanMatre Quintet.
2011	Serenade in Blue	Producer, Music Director, and Conductor. Performance by the CCM Jazz Ensemble and CCM Jazz Chamber Ensemble.
2008	Treadin' With Treadwell	Producer, Music Director, and Conductor. Performance by the CCM Jazz Ensemble and CCM Jazz Combo.
2004	All The Right Angles	Saxophonist and producer on album by the CCM Faculty Jazztet.
1998	Lady Bird	Producer, Music Director, and Conductor. Performance by the CCM Jazz Ensemble and CCM Jazz Combo.
1994	Carnival of Life	Producer, Music Director, and Conductor. Performance by the CCM Jazz Ensemble and Two O'Clock Jazz Combo. Two O'Clock Combo directed by Pat Harbison.
1992	The Cincinnati Seven Jazz Septet	Saxophonist and Producer. Also released as In A Whirl.

=== Featured soloist ===
- 2011, Tenor saxophone soloist on album Melodious Monk (Kim Pensyl / Phil DeGreg Ensemble).
- 2010, Soprano saxophone and Thai wood flute solos on album On the Horizon (Kim Pensyl Ensemble).
- 2007, Tenor saxophone and co-composer on album Sound Collaborations (Consortium for Computer Music Series, Mara Helmuth Composer).
- 2004, Alto saxophone and flute soloist on album Salutaris Plates (Marc Fields).
- 2003, Tenor saxophone and clarinet soloist on album Got Swing! (The Cincinnati Pops Orchestra and Erich Kunzel)
- 1995, Saxophonist on album Reactivation (PsychoAcoustic Orchestra)
- 1994, Saxophonist on album Supreme Thing (PsychoAcoustic Orchestra)

=== DVD and video performances ===
- 2005, Tenor and soprano saxophone and clarinet soloist in The Tuner, A Musical Prophecy in Seven Scenes DVD by Frank Proto Ensemble.
- 2003, Tenor saxophone and clarinet soloist on The Profanation of Hubert J. Fort, An Allegory in Four Scenes DVD with the Frank Proto Ensemble.
