= Francis de Sales (disambiguation) =

Francis de Sales (1567–1622) was the bishop of Geneva.

Francis de Sales or Saint Francis de Sales may also refer to:

- Francis De Sales (actor) (1912–1988), American actor
- Cathedral of St. Francis de Sales (disambiguation)
- St Francis de Sales College, Mount Barker, South Australia
- St. Francis de Sales' Church (disambiguation)
- St. Francis de Sales High School (disambiguation)
- St. Francis De Sales Regional Catholic School, Herkimer, New York, United States
- St Francis de Sales Regional College, Leeton, New South Wales, Australia
- St Francis de Sales, Hampton Hill and Upper Teddington, a Roman Catholic church in Hampton Hill, Richmond upon Thames, London

== See also ==
- St. Francis (disambiguation)
