= List of parishes in the Diocese of Albany =

The Roman Catholic Diocese of Albany covers the Capital District (Albany, Schenectady, Rensselaer, and Saratoga counties), as well as Warren, Washington, Greene, Columbia, Schoharie, Otsego, Delaware, Fulton, Montgomery, southern Herkimer, and extreme southeastern Hamilton counties in New York state. In these fourteen counties, there are over 100 parishes, along with a number of parish missions, divided among 14 deaneries, 7 vicariates and 29 "local Catholic communities".

For a list of closed churches and suppressed parishes, see List of suppressed parishes in the Roman Catholic Diocese of Albany.

== Adirondack Vicariate ==
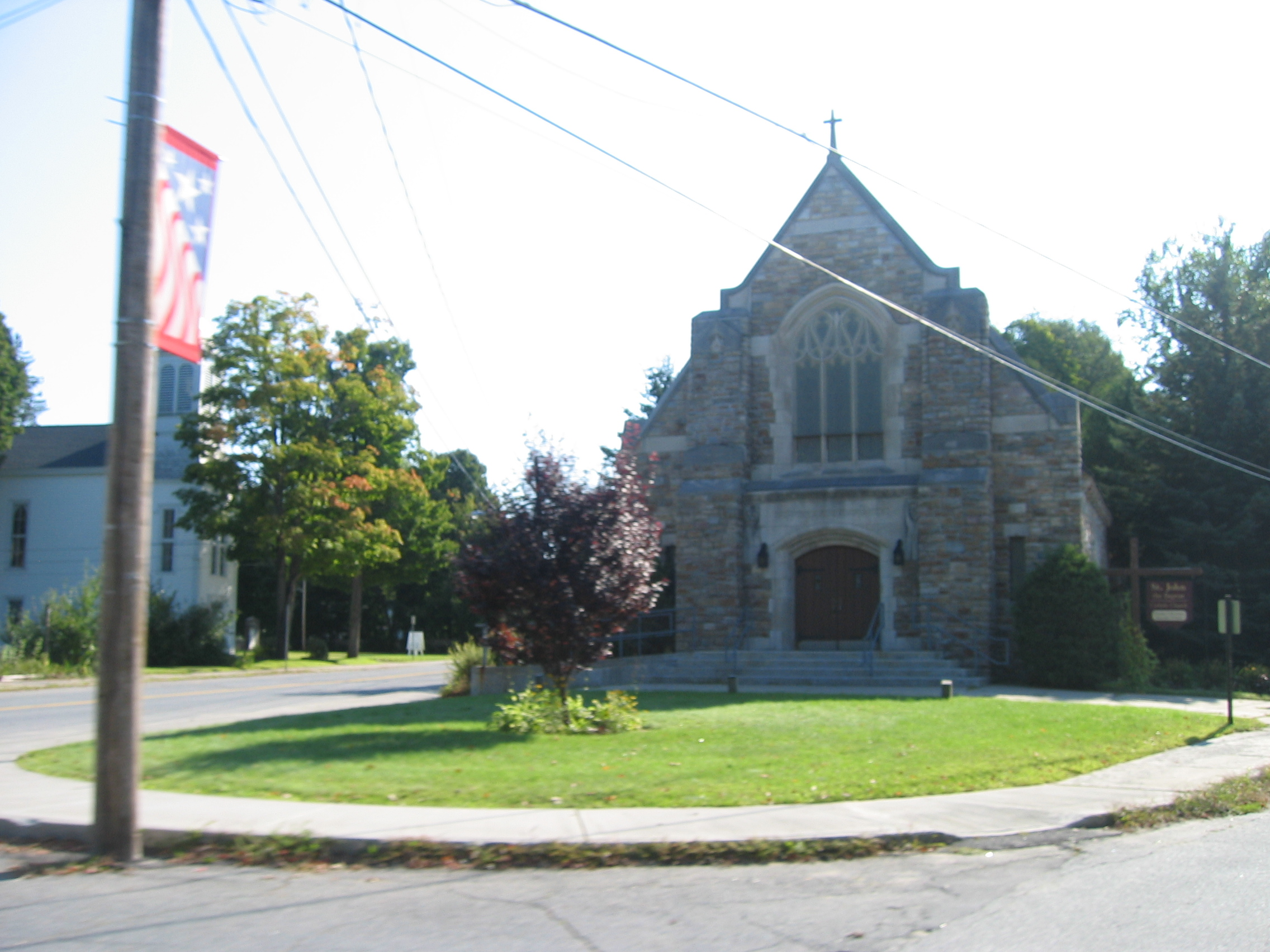
St. Issac Jogues Church, Chestertown

Vicar: Very Rev. Scott VanDerVeer

- Battenkill Catholic Cluster:
  - Holy Cross Church (Salem) – Established in 1859
  - Notre Dame-Visitation Church (Schuylerville) – Established in 1889; formed from merger of Notre Dame de Lourdes and Visitation of the Blessed Virgin Mary (later Our Lady of the Visitation)
  - St. Joseph's Church (Greenwich) – Established in 1878
  - St. Patrick's Church (Cambridge) – Established in 1856
- Blessed Sacrament Church (Bolton Landing) – Established in 1929
- Holy Mother and Child Parish (Lake Luzerne/Corinth) – Established in 2009 from a merger of Immaculate Conception Church in Corinth (established in 1905) and Holy Infancy in Lake Luzerne (established circa 1874; originally a mission of the former)
- Parish of St. Isaac Jogues (Saratoga Lake) – Mission church of All Saints on the Hudson Parish of both Mechanicville and Stillwater in the Twin Rivers Vicariate
  - Masses held only from Memorial Day-Labor Day
- Our Lady of the Annunciation Church (Queensbury) – Established in 1970; formerly a mission of St. Mary's in Glens Falls
- Our Lady of Hope Church (Whitehall) – Established in 2000 from a merger of Notre Dame des Victoires and Our Lady of Victory
  - Yoked with St. Ann's Church (Fort Ann) – Established in 1880; originally a mission parish
    - Mission: Chapel of the Assumption (Huletts Landing)
      - Masses only held from Memorial Day-Labor Day
- Sacred Heart Church (Lake George) – Established in 1874
- The Catholic Community of St. Cecilia (Warrensburg) – Established in 1874
- St. Clements Church (Saratoga Springs) – Established in 1916; staffed by the Redemptorist Fathers
  - Mission: St. Therese (Gansevoort) – Established in 1965
- Parish of St. Isaac Jogues (Hague/Chestertown) – Established in 2009 from a merger of Blessed Sacrament of Hague and St. John the Baptist in Chestertown:
  - Mission: St. James' Church (North Creek) – Established in 1884
- St. Joseph's Church (Fort Edward) – Established in 1869
- St. Joseph's Church (Greenfield Center) – Established in 1940
  - Mission: St. Paul's Church (Rock City Falls)
- St. Mary's Church (Ballston Spa) – Established in 1867; originally a mission of the Church of St. Peter of Saratoga Springs
  - Mission: St. Mary's Church (Galway)
    - Masses held between Independence Day-Labor Day
- St. Mary's Church (Glens Falls) – Established in 1848; records from the former St. Alphonsus Church are held here
- St. Mary's Church (Granville) – Established in 1883; formed from a merger of All Saints Church in Granville and Our Lady of Mount Carmel in Middle Granville
- Church of St. Mary's/St. Paul's (Hudson Falls) – Established in 1992
- St. Michael the Archangel Church (South Glens Falls) – Established in 1955
- Church of St. Peter (Saratoga Springs) – Established in 1834; the first time that Catholics in Saratoga County came together to worship in a church.

== Beverwyck Vicariate ==
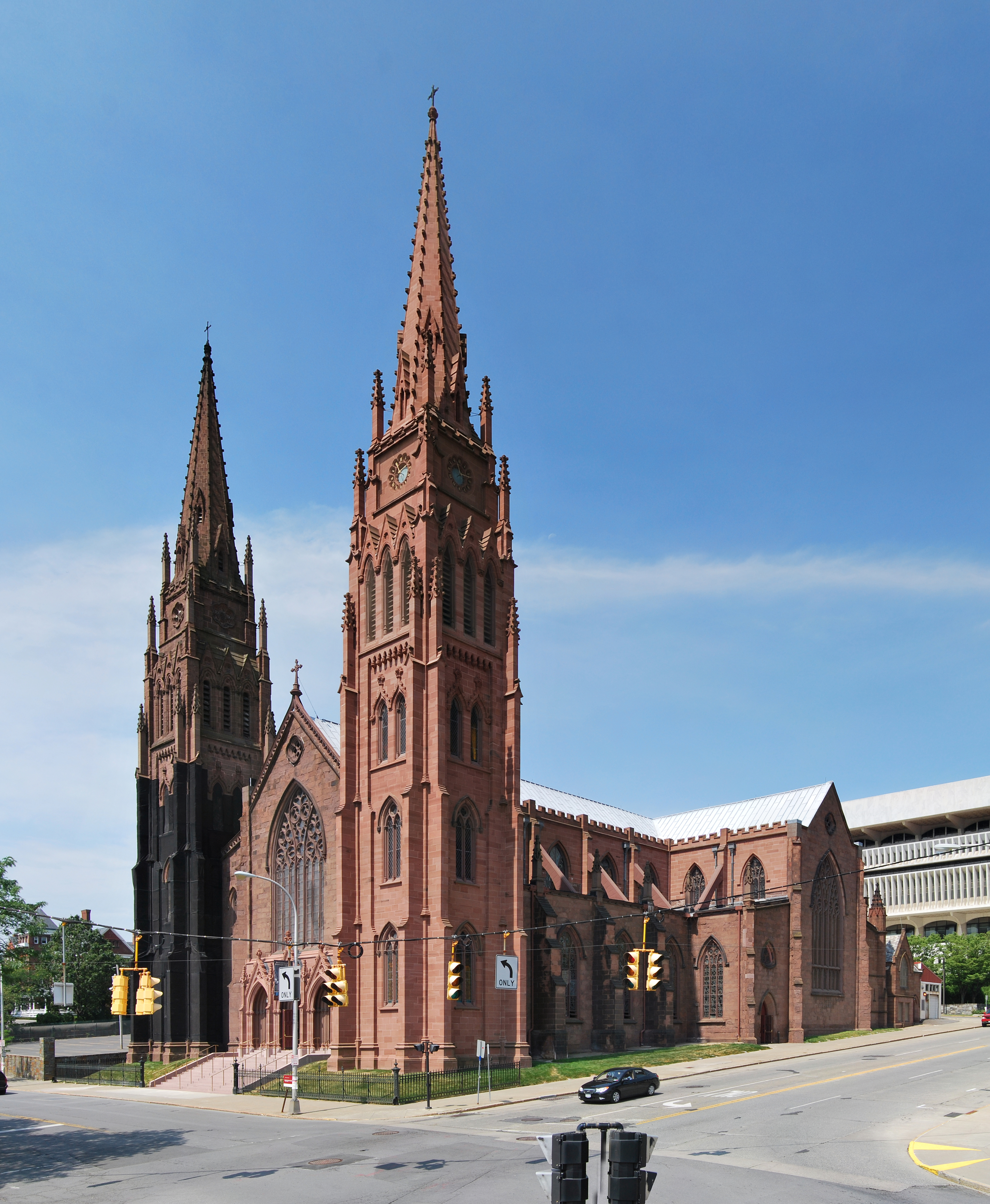
Cathedral of the Immaculate Conception, Albany

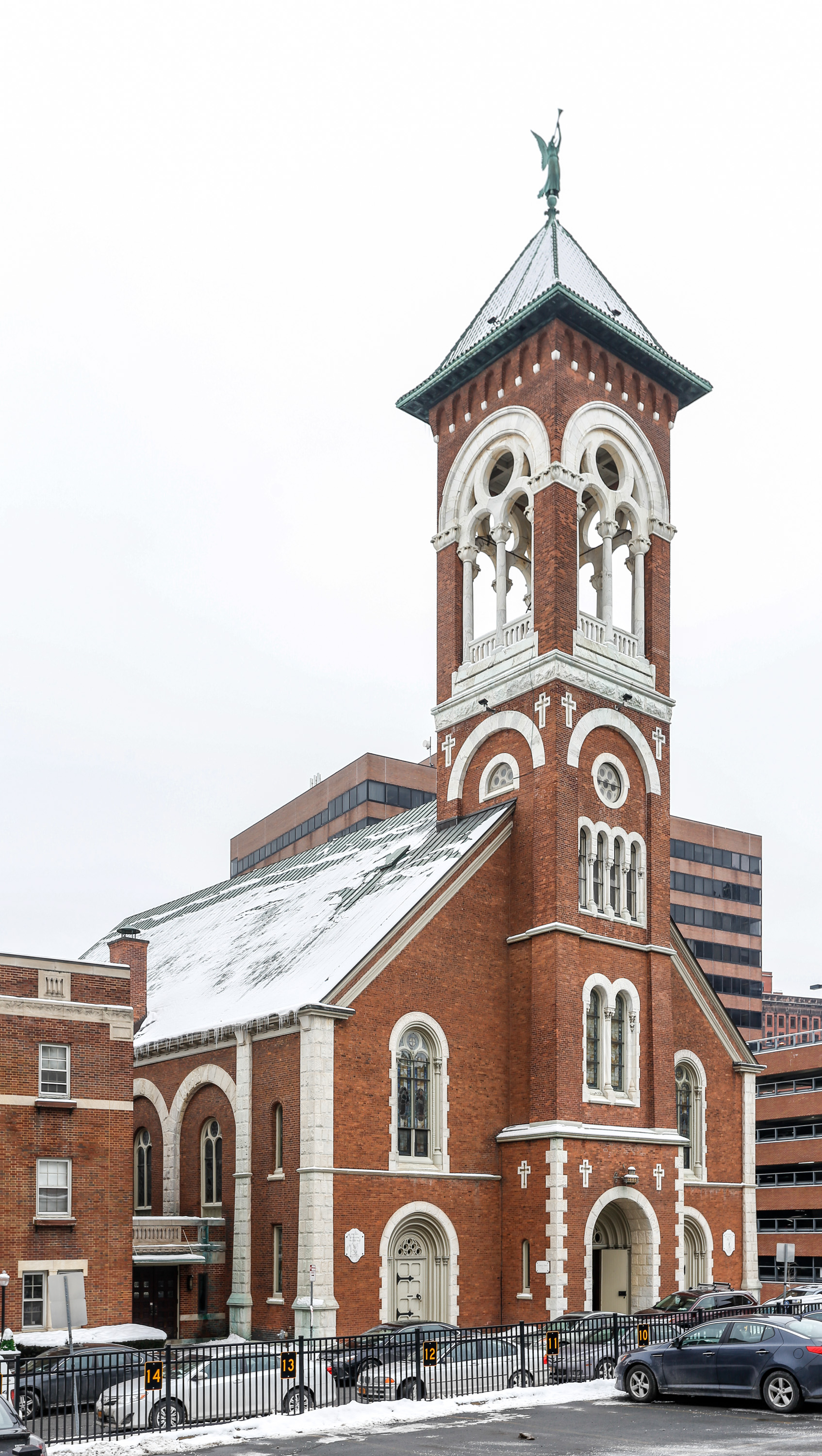
St. Mary's Church, Albany

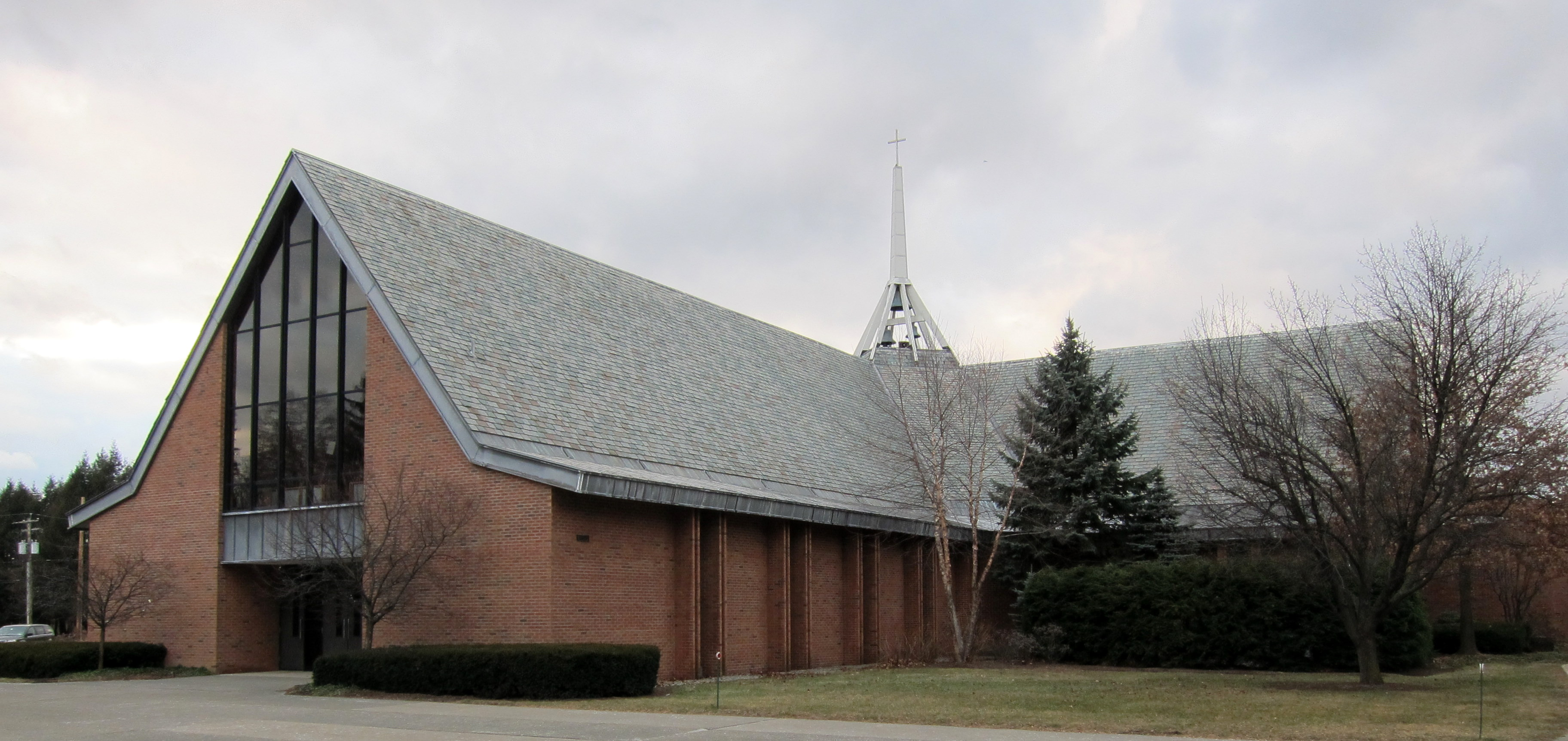
St. Pius X, Loudonville

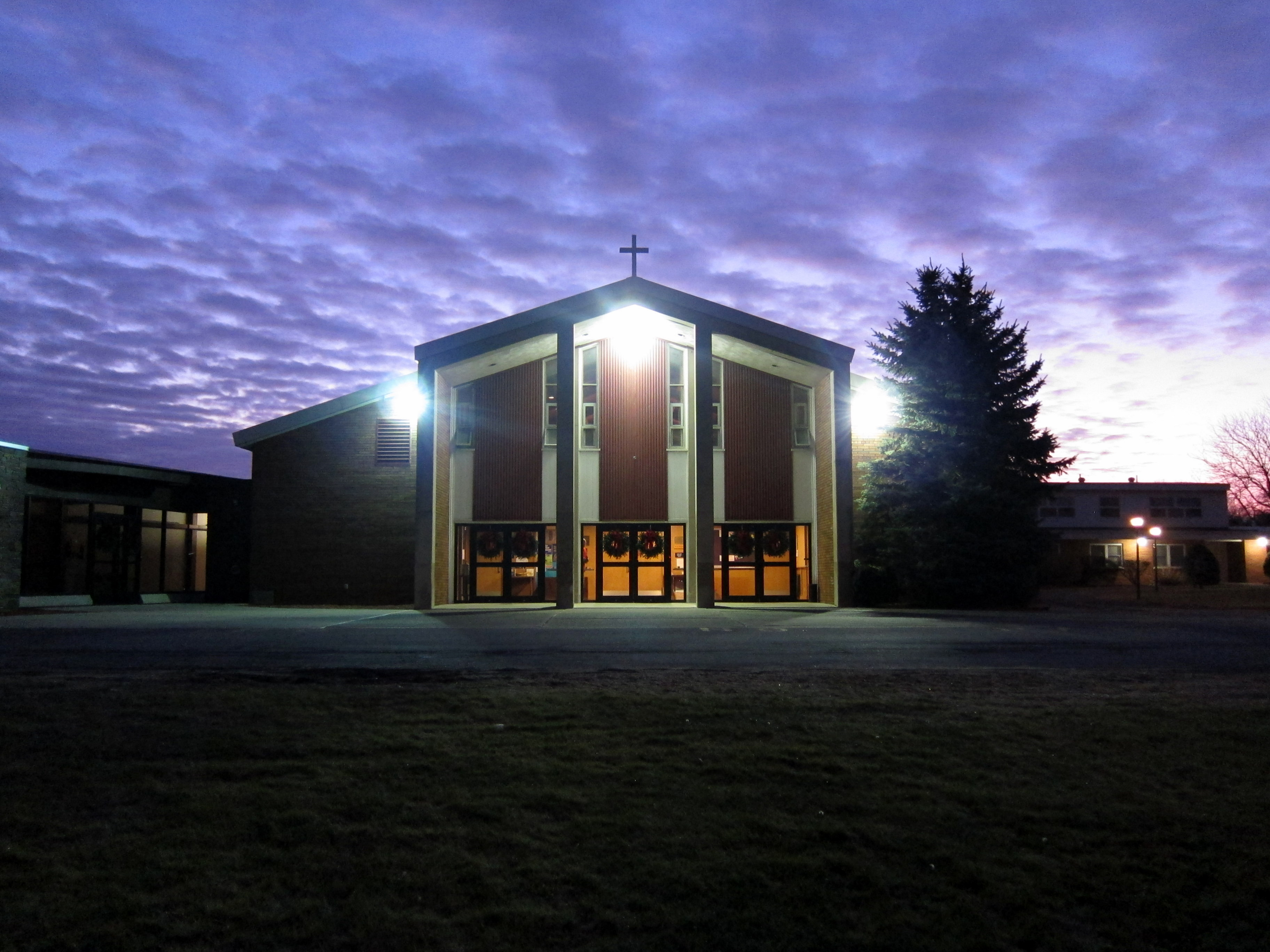
St. Ambrose, Latham

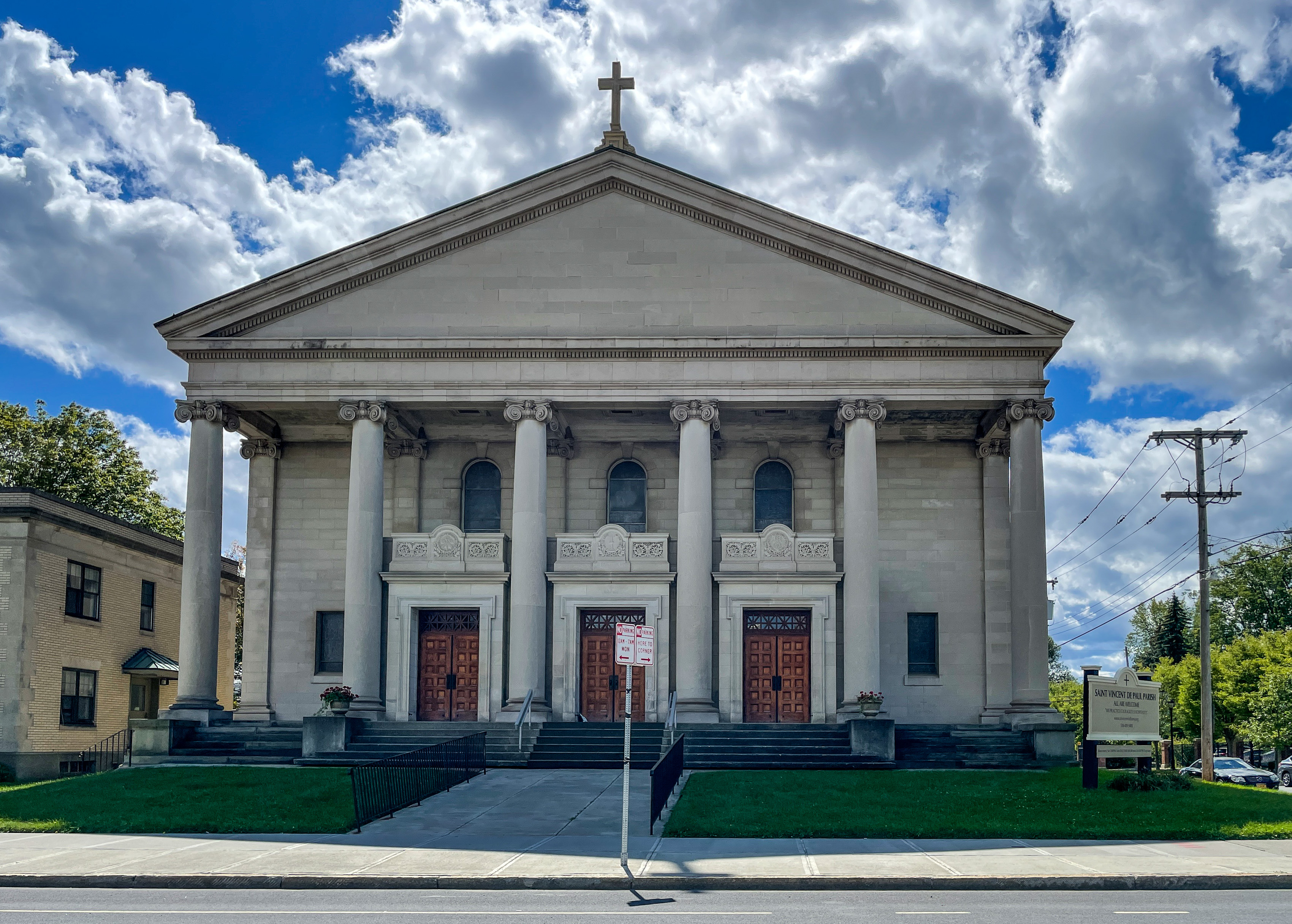
St. Vincent de Paul Parish, Madison Avenue

Vicar: Very Rev. Mark G. Reamer
All parishes listed are located in the City of Albany unless otherwise noted.

- Cathedral of the Immaculate Conception (125 Eagle St. at Madison Ave.) – Mother church of the diocese; established in 1848
- All Saints Catholic Church (16 Homestead St.) – Formed from the merger of Holy Cross Church (established in 1858) and St. Margaret Mary (established in 1938) in 2009
- Church of the Blessed Sacrament (607-609 Central Ave.) – Established in 1902; records of St. Casimir's, Our Lady of Angels, and St. Patrick's Churches held here
  - Mission: Shrine Church of Our Lady of Americas (Hispanic Catholic Apostolate) (273 Central Ave.) – Established in 1986
- Christ, Our Light Church (Loudonville) – Established in 2009 from the merger of St. Francis de Sales in Loudonville and Our Lady of Mercy in Colonie
- Christ the King Church (Guilderland) – Established in 1957
- Church of Saint Clare (Colonie) – Established in 1940
- Korean Catholic Apostolate (Colonie) Established in 2007
- Our Lady of the Assumption Church (Latham) – Established in 1963 after the building which originally housed the church (Assumption of the Blessed Virgin Mary) was demolished to make way for the Empire State Plaza in Albany
- Parish of Mater Christi (Hurst Ave. at Hopewell St) – Established in 2009; formed from the merger of St. Catherine of Siena and St. Teresa of Avila
- Sacred Heart of Jesus (33 Walter St.) – Established in 1874; records of St. Joseph's Church held here
  - Vietnamese Apostolate – Originally part of St. Joseph's Church, which was absorbed by Sacred Heart of Jesus after its closing in 1994
- Saint Ambrose Church (Latham) – Established in 1924
- St. Francis of Assisi Parish (391 Delaware Ave. at St. James Place; 88 Fourth Ave. at Franklin St.) – Established in 2010; formed from the merger of St. John's-St. Ann's and St. James
- St. Joan of Arc Roman Catholic Church (Black Catholic Apostolate) (Menands) – Established in 1927; BCA established in 1984
- St. Lucy/St. Bernadette Church (Altamont) – Established in 1918
- St. Mary's Church (10 Lodge St.) – Established in 1797
- St. Matthew's Church (Voorheesville) – Established in 1962
- St. Pius X Catholic Church (Loudonville) – Established in 1951
- St. Thomas the Apostle Church (Delmar) – Established in 1907
- St. Vincent de Paul's Church (900 Madison Ave. at Partridge St.) – Established in 1885

== Hudson Valley Vicariate ==
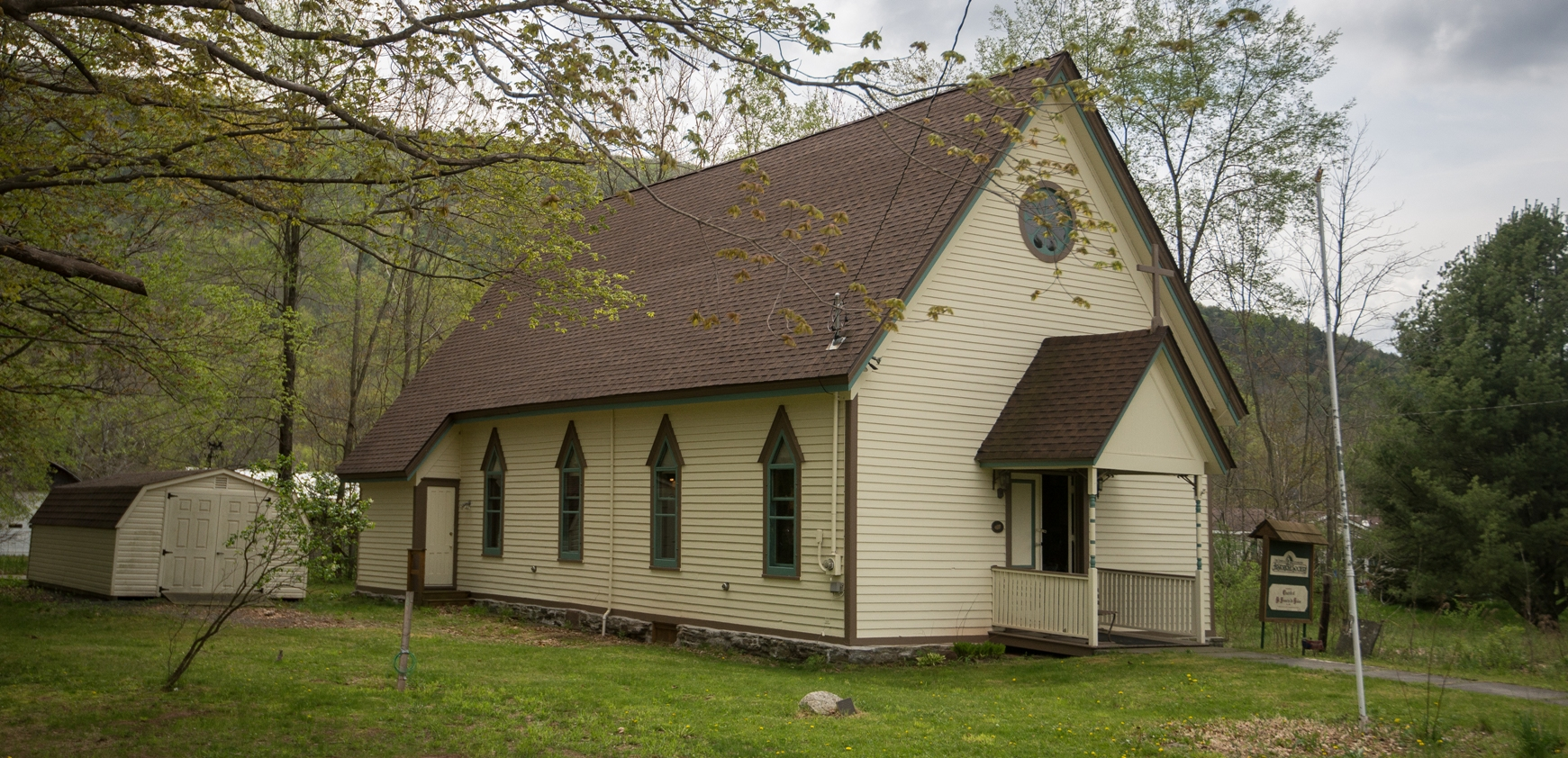
St. Francis De Sales Church, Greene County

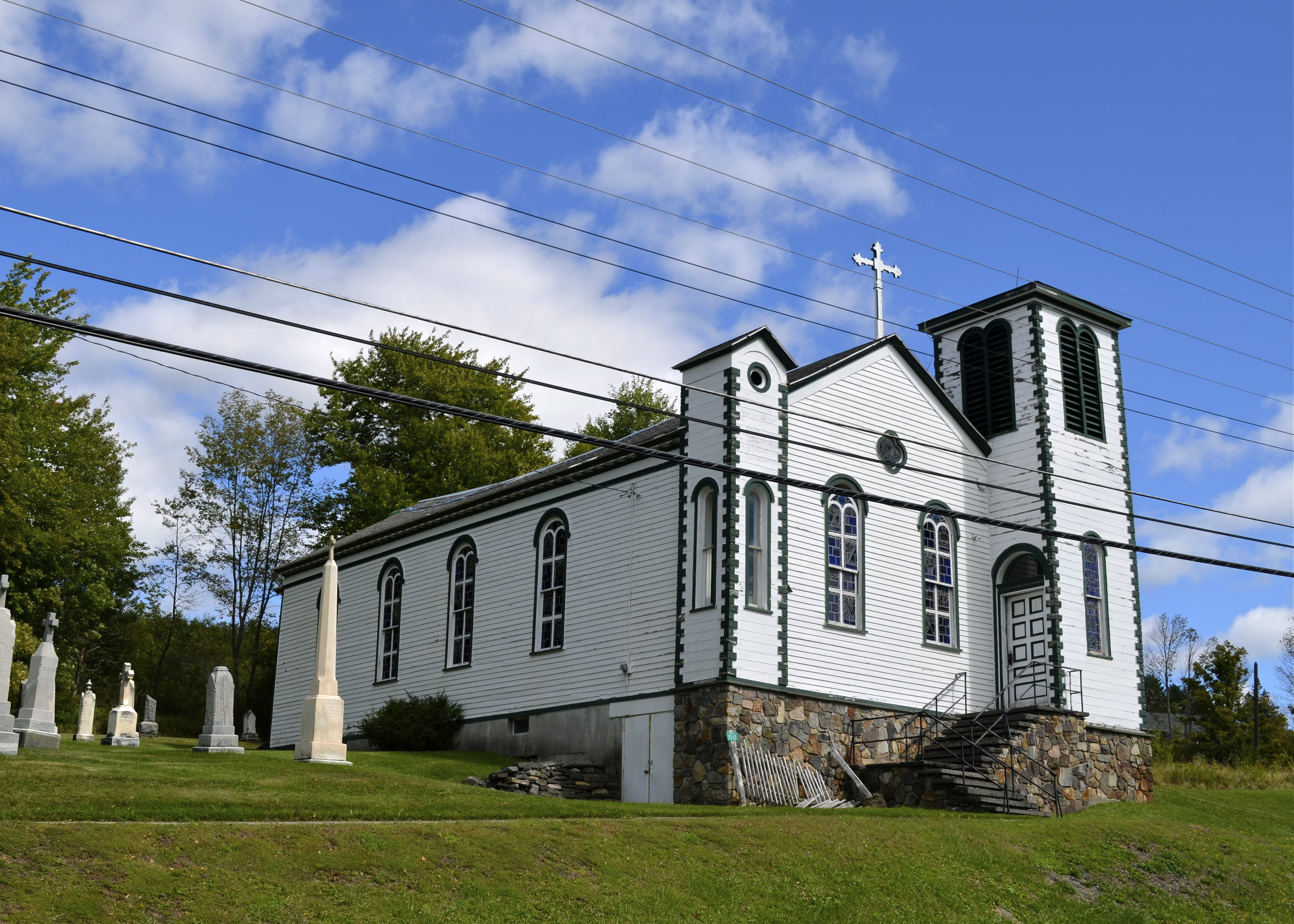
St. Mary of the Mountain Church, Hunter

Vicar: Very Rev. Anthony Barratt

- Church of St. Joseph (Stottville/Stuyvesant Falls) – Established in 2009
- The Church of Saint Patrick (Ravena) – Established in 1890
- Holy Trinity Parish – Established in 2009:
  - Church of St. Mary (Hudson)
  - Church of the Resurrection (Germantown)
  - Chapel of the Nativity of Our Lord (Linlithgo)
- Immaculate Conception (New Lebanon) – Established in 1871
  - Mission: St. Joseph's Church (Stephentown) – Established in 1868; originally a mission of Sacred Heart in Berlin in 1928
- Parish of Our Lady of Hope (Copake Falls) – Formed from merger of St. Bridget's in Copake Falls and St. John Vianney in Claverack in 2009
- Sacred Heart Church (Cairo) – Established in 1895
  - Mission: Our Lady of Knock Shrine (East Durham)
- Sacred Heart-Immaculate Conecption (Haines Falls/Palenville) – Formed through a merger in 2009
  - Mission: St. Francis de Sales (Elka Park)
- St. James Church (Chatham) – Established in 1865
- St. John the Baptist Church (Greenville)^{†} – Established in 1932
- St. John the Baptist Church (Valatie) – Established in 1869
- St. Mary's Church (Coxsackie) – Established in 1854
- St. Patrick's Church (Athens) – Established in 1921
- St. Patrick's Church (Catskill) – Established in 1859
- St. Theresa of the Child Jesus Church (Windham) – Established in 1965
  - Mission: St. Joseph's Church (Ashland)

== Leatherstocking Vicariate ==
Vicar: Very Rev. Michael Cambi

- Holy Cross Church (Morris) – Established in 1946
- Parish of Our Lady of the Valley (Middleburgh) – Established in 2009 from a merger of St. Catherine's in Middleburgh and St. Joseph's Church in Schoharie
- Sacred Heart Church (Margaretville) – Established in 1920
  - Mission: St. Anne's Church (Andes)
- Sacred Heart Church (Sidney) – Established in 1921
- Sacred Heart Church (Stamford) – Established in 1890
  - Mission: St. Philip Neri (Grand Gorge)
- St. John the Baptist Church (Walton) – Established in 1912
  - Yoked with St. Peter's Church (Delhi) – Established in 1850
  - Mission: Holy Family (Downsville)
- St. Joseph's Church (Worcester) – Established in 1878
- St. Mary's Our Lady of the Lake Catholic Church (Cooperstown) – Established in 1867
- St. Mary's Church (Oneonta) – Established in 1883
- St. Paul the Apostle (Hancock) – Established in 1888
- St. Thomas the Apostle Church (Cherry Valley) – Established in 1903; records of Blessed Sacrament in Springfield Center and St. Mary's in Sharon Springs held here
- St. Vincent de Paul's Church (Cobleskill) – Established in 1860

== Mohawk Valley Vicariate ==
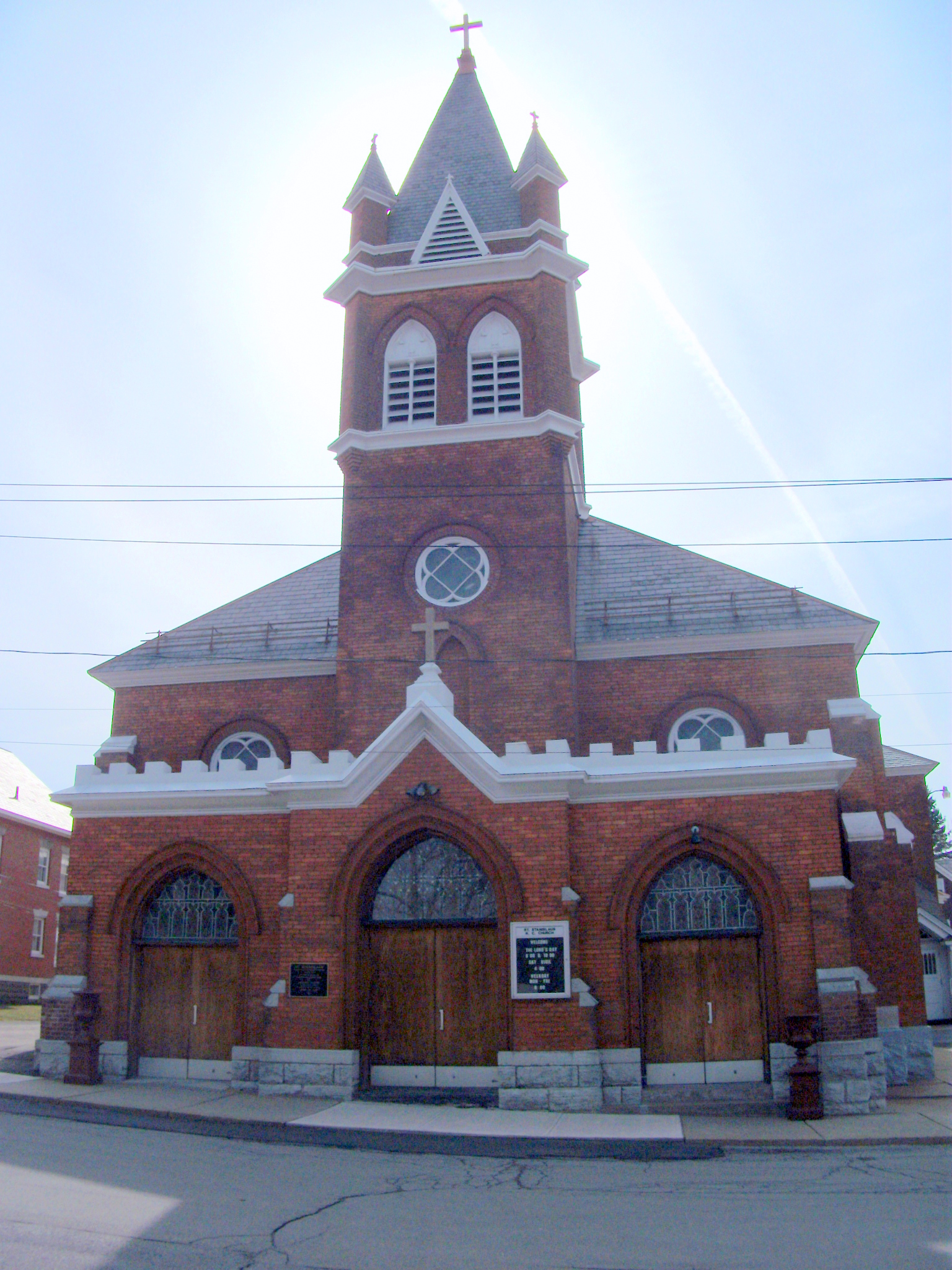
St. Stanislaus. Amsterdam

Vicar: Very Rev. O. Robert DeMartenis

- Annunciation Church (Ilion) – Established in 1868
- Blessed Sacrament Church (Mohawk) – Established in 1901
- Holy Family Parish (Little Falls) – Established in 1838 as St. Mary's Church; merged with Sacred Heart (established in 1911) and St. Joseph's (established in 1923) in 1992
  - Yoked with St. Joseph's Church (Dolgeville) – Established in 1872
- Church of the Holy Spirit (Gloversville) – Established in 2009 from merger of Sacred Heart and St. Mary of Mount Carmel
- Church of Saints Anthony and Joseph (Herkimer) – Established in 1917
  - Yoked with St. John the Baptist Church (Newport) – Established in 1895
- Holy Trinity Catholic Church (Johnstown) – Established in 2003
- Parish of Our Lady of Hope (Fort Plain) – Established in 2009 from a merger of St. James, Sts. Peter and Paul in Canajoharie, and St. Patrick's in St. Johnsville
- Our Lady Queen of Apostles Church (Frankfort) – Established in 1995
- Sacred Heart Church (Tribes Hill) – Established in 1875
- St. Cecilia's Church (Fonda) – Established in 1882
- St. Francis of Assisi (Northville) – Established in 1920
- St. Francis de Sales Church (Herkimer) – Established in 1875
- Parish of St. Joseph/St. Michael/Our Lady of Mt. Carmel (Amsterdam) – Established in 1979
- St. Joseph the Worker (Richfield Springs/West Winfield) – Established in 2009 from a merger of both St. Joseph's Churches
- St. Joseph's Church (Broadalbin) – Established in 1875
- St. Mary's Church (Amsterdam)^{†} – Established in 1838
- Saint Stanislaus Parish (Amsterdam) – Established in 1894
- St. Stephen's Church (Hagaman) – Established in 1923

== Taconic Vicariate ==
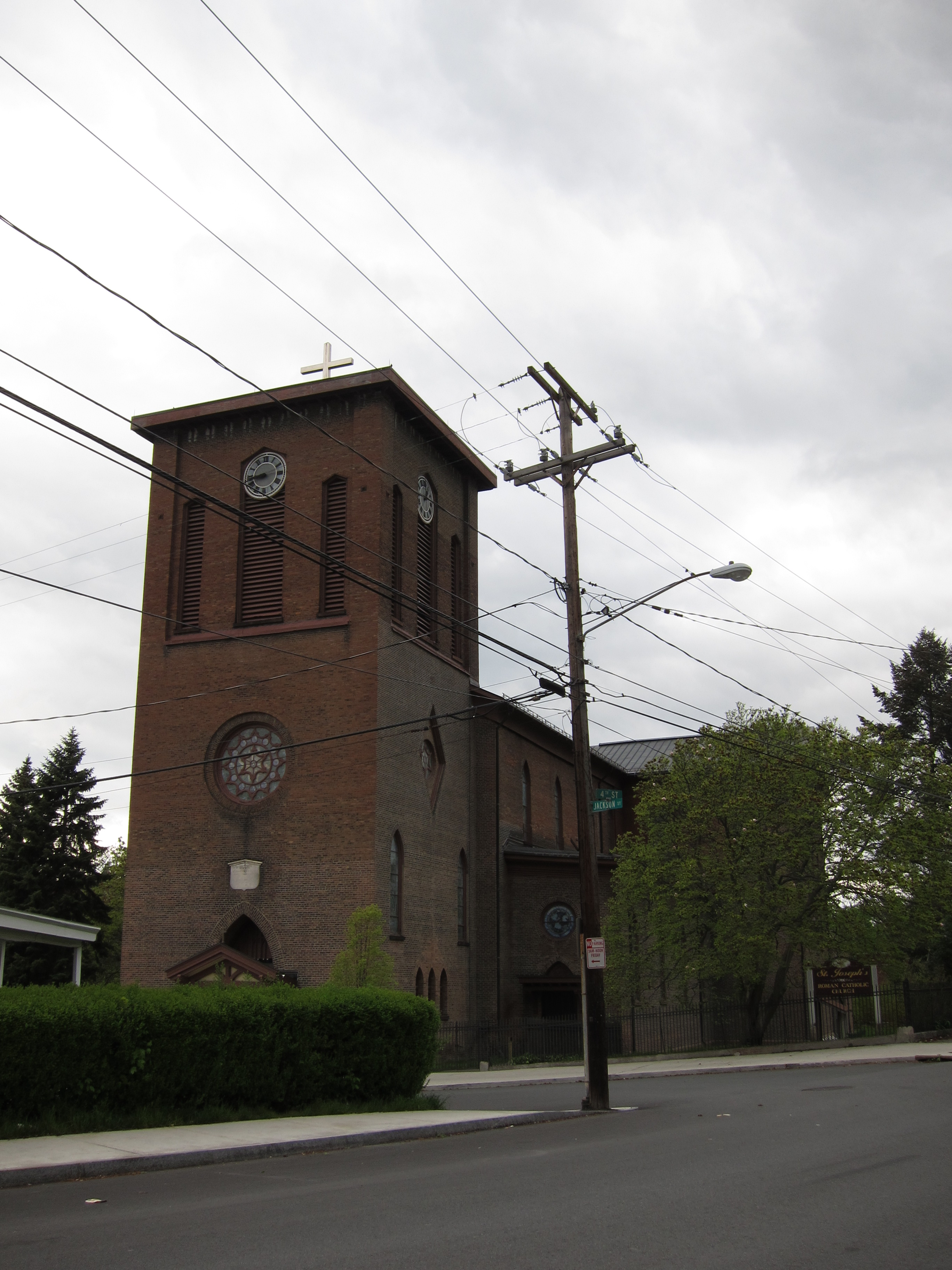
St. Joseph's Church, Troy

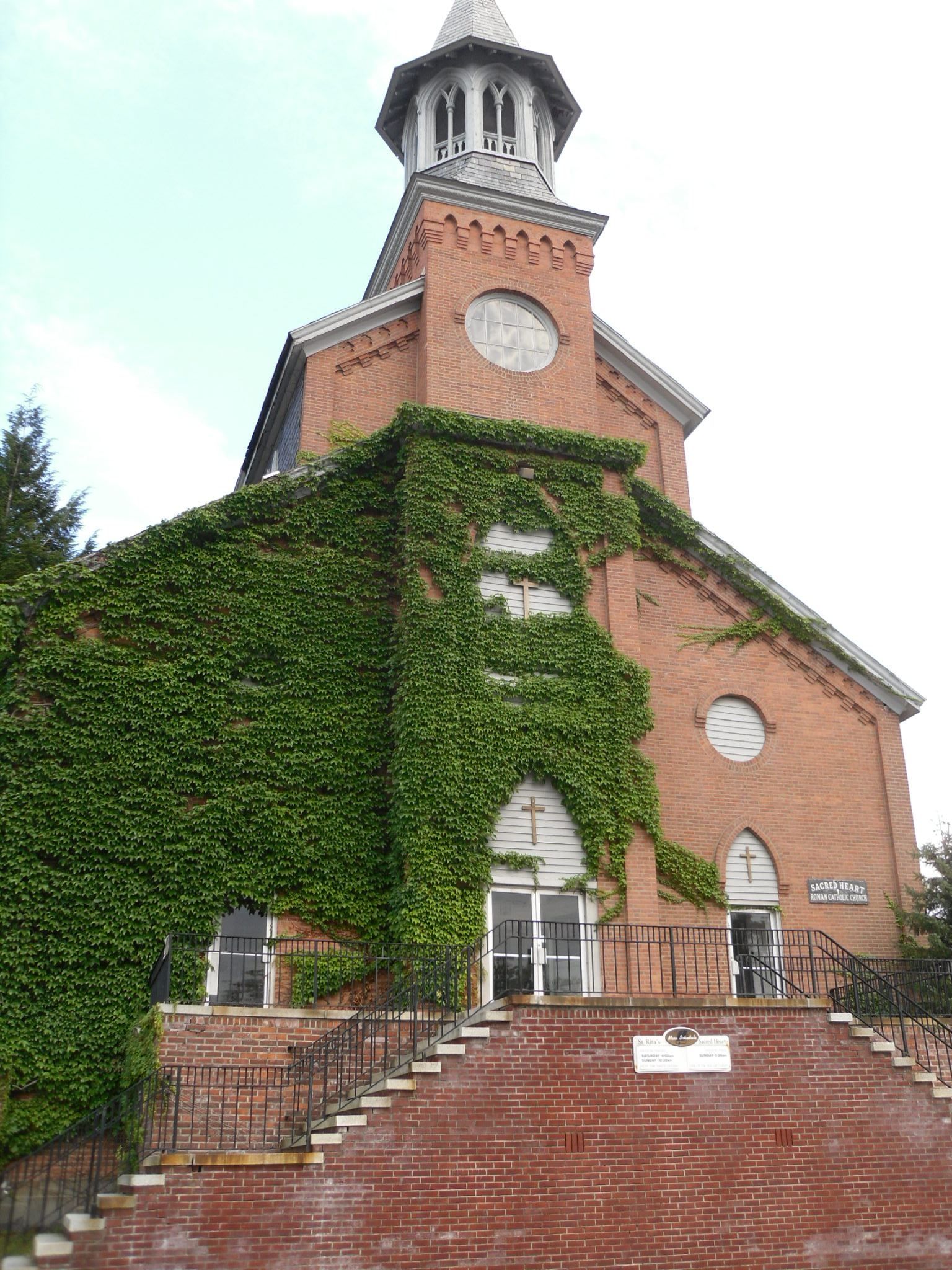
Sacred Heart Church, Cohoes

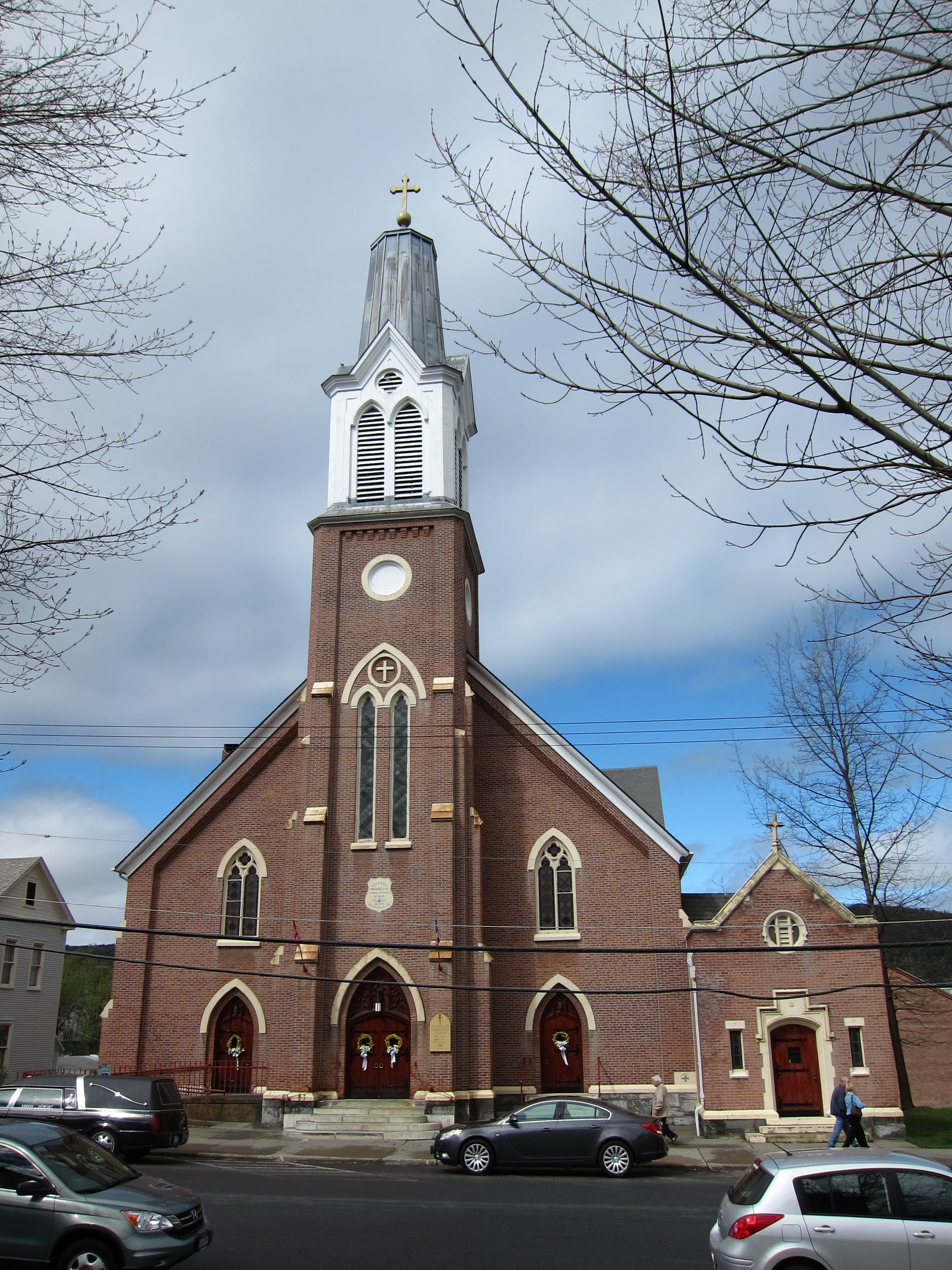
Church of the Immaculate Conception, Hoosick Falls

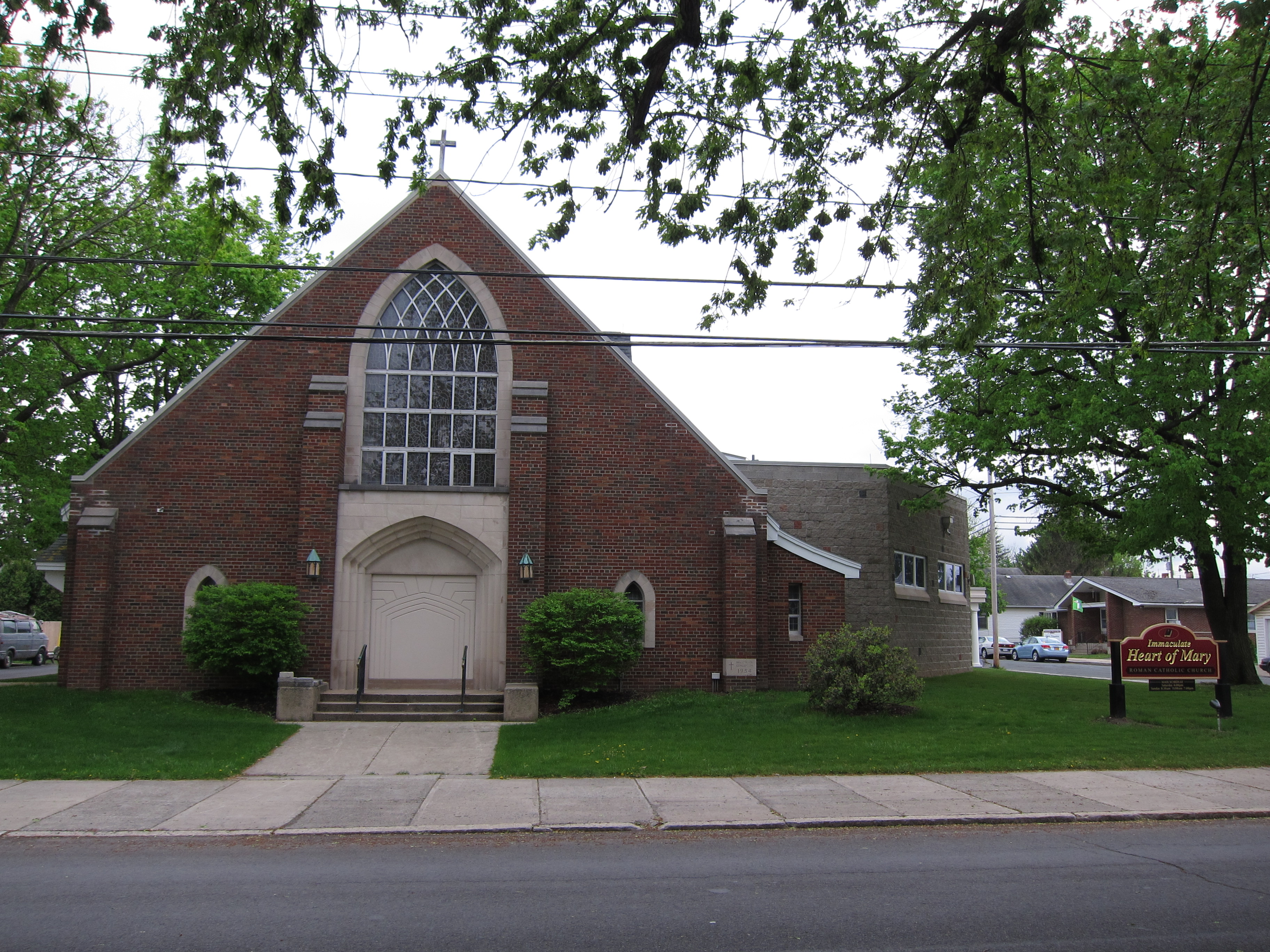
Church of the Immaculate Heart of Mary, Watervliet

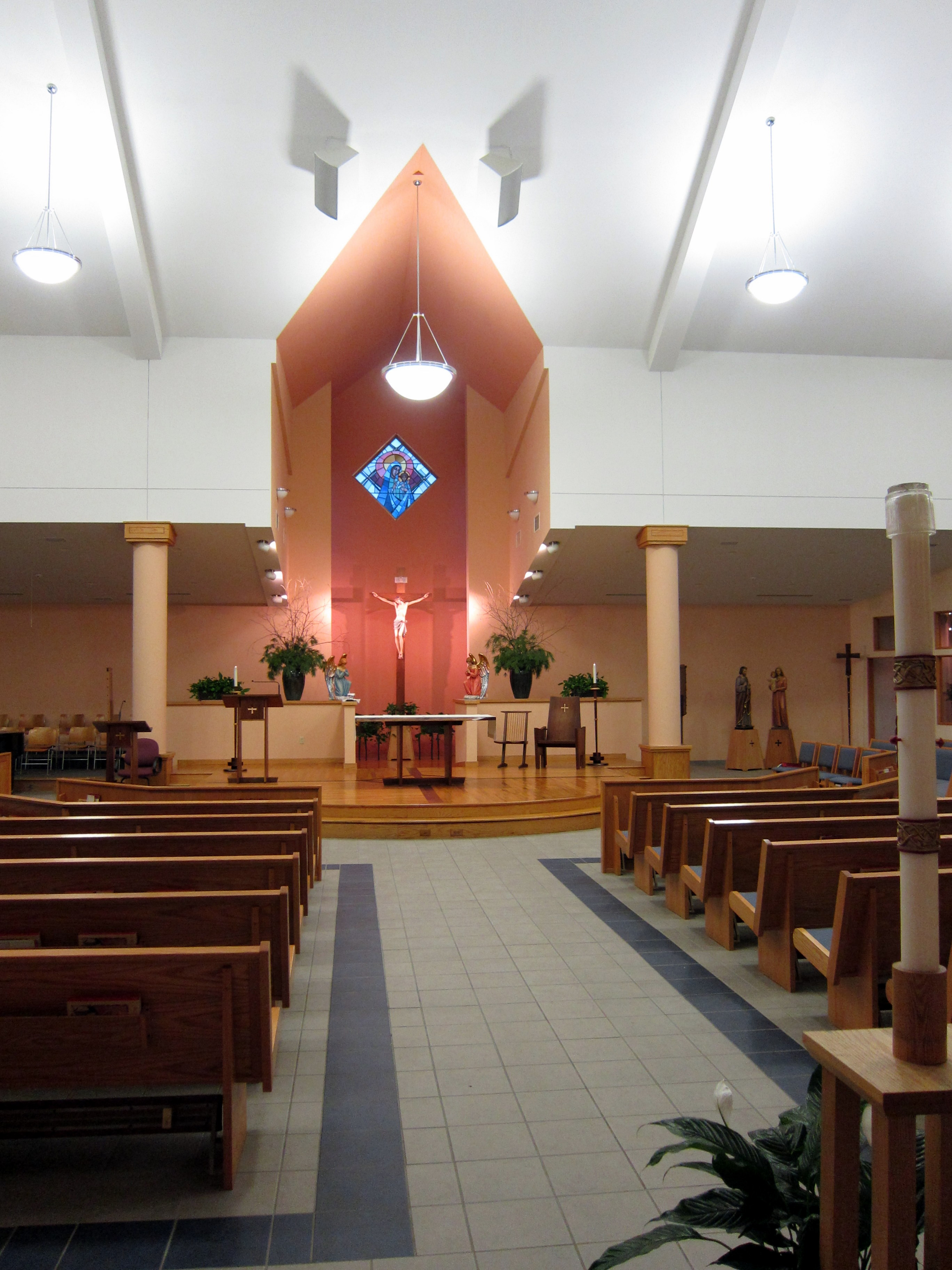
Our Lady of Victory Church, Troy

Vicar: Very Rev. Richard Donovan
All churches listed are in the City of Troy unless otherwise listed

- Christ Sun of Justice (2125 Burdett Ave., across from the Houston Field House) – Established in 1969; parish of RPI, also seat to its Newman Foundation; located at the Chapel + Cultural Center at Rensselaer on the RPI campus
- Church of the Holy Trinity (Cohoes) – Established in 1998; present parish formed from the merger of the Churches of St. Agnes, St. Marie (originally St. Joseph's Church), and St. Patrick's churches; St. Agnes and St. Patrick's had already merged by 1995. Yoked with St. Michael’s Church.
- Holy Spirit Church (East Greenbush) – Established in 1923
- Immaculate Conception (Hoosick Falls) – Established in 1867
- Immaculate Heart of Mary (Watervliet/Green Island) – Established in 2005 from the merger of St. Patrick's Church in Watervliet and St. Joseph's in Green Island
- The Catholic Community of Our Lady of Victory (55 North Lake Ave.) – Established in 1922
  - Mission: Parish of Our Lady of the Snow (Grafton) – Established in 2009 from a merger of Sacred Heart in Berlin and St. John Francis Regis in Grafton; formerly a separate parish
- Sacred Heart Church (310 Spring Ave.) – Established in 1913; records of St. Francis de Sales and St. William's Churches held here
- Sacred Heart Church (Castleton-on-Hudson) – Established in 1887
- St. Anthony of Padua Shrine Church (28 State St. at intersection with 3rd St.) – Established in 1892; staffed by Franciscan priests; records of St. Patrick's and St. Peter's churches are held here
- St. Augustine's Church (25 115th St.) – Established in 1844
- St. Henry's Church (Averill Park) – Established in 1868
- Parish of St. John the Evangelist and St. Joseph (Rensselaer) – Established in 1851 and 1915, respectively; merged in 2006
- St. Joseph's Church^{†} (416 Third St. at Jackson St.) – Established in 1847; records of Church of the Holy Trinity and St. Mary's Church held here. One of the few parishes to celebrate the Latin Carmelite Rite.
- St. Jude the Apostle (Wynantskill) – Established in 1953
- St. Mary's Church (Nassau) – Established in 1852
- St. Mary's Church at Clinton Heights (Rensselaer) – Established in 1952
- St. Mary of the Assumption Church (Waterford) – Established in 1843; records of St. Ann's held here
- St. Michael's Church (Cohoes) (Polish) – Established in 1904; yoked with Church of the Holy Trinity
- St. Michael the Archangel Church (175 Williams Rd.; located in the Town of North Greenbush) – Established in 1874
- Transfiguration Parish – Established in 2010 from a merger of the two churches listed below:
  - Church of the Holy Trinity (Schaghticoke) – Established in 1845; formed in 2001 from a merger with St. John the Baptist (established in 1839), Our Lady of Good Counsel in Valley Falls (established in 1889), St. Monica's Church in Johnsonville (established in 1888)
  - St. Bonaventure's (Speigeltown) – Established in 1970

== Twin Rivers Vicariate ==
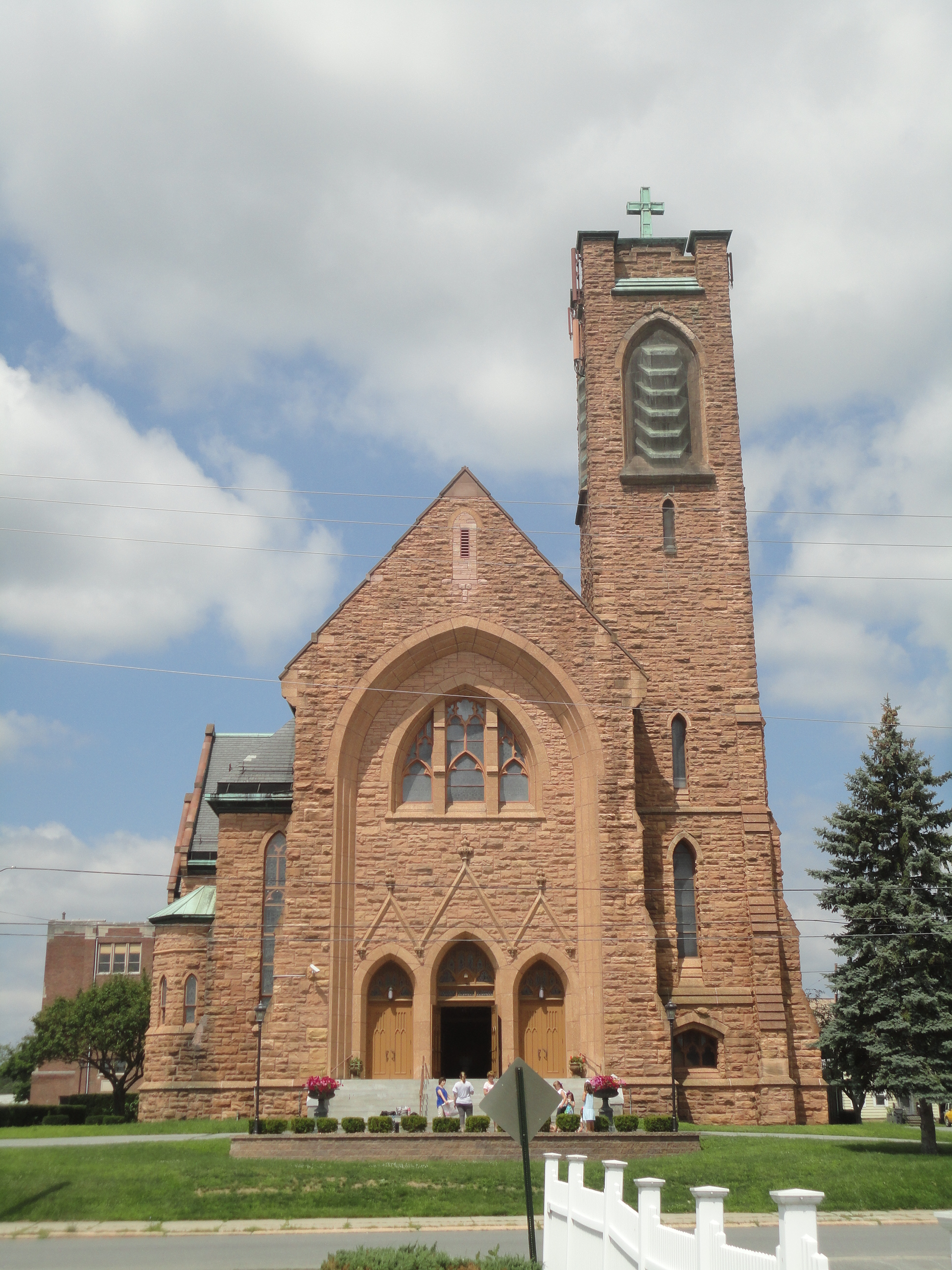
St. Paul the Apostle Church, Mechanicville

Vicar: Very Rev. James Belogi
All churches are located in the City of Schenectady unless otherwise noted

- All Saints on the Hudson Parish (Mechanicville/Stillwater) – St. Paul's Church in Mechanicville established in 1852; merged with Church of the Assumption in 1977 to form the Church of Assumption/St. Paul; merged with St. Peter's Church in Stillwater in 2011
- Church of St. Adalbert (550 Lansing St.) – Established in 1903; yoked with Our Lady of Mt. Carmel and St. Paul the Apostle
- Corpus Christi Church (Round Lake; located in the Town of Clifton Park) – Established in 1946
- Immaculate Conception Church (Glenville) – Established in 1957
- Our Lady of Fatima Church (Delanson) – Established in 1952
- Our Lady of Grace Church (Ballston Lake) – Established in 1922
- Our Lady of Mount Carmel Church (1260 Pleasant St. at Hodgson St.) – Established in 1922; yoked with Church of St. Adalbert
  - Mission: St. Paul the Apostle Church (2733 Albany St. at Kings Rd.) – Established in 1922
- Our Lady, Queen of Peace (Rotterdam) – Established in 2010 from a merger of Immaculate Conception (established in 1904) and Our Lady of the Assumption (established in 1934)
  - Mission: St. Margaret of Cortona (Rotterdam Junction) – Established in 1904; formerly a mission of St. Joseph's Church in Schenectady
- St. Anthony's Church (Nott St. at Seward Pl.) – Established in 1902
- St. Edward the Confessor Church (Clifton Park) – Established in 1967
- St. Gabriel the Archangel Church (Rotterdam) – Established in 1956
- St. John the Evangelist Church (812 Union St.) – Established in 1904
- St. Joseph's Church (600 State St.) – Established in 1862
- St. Joseph's Church (Scotia) – Established in 1907
- St. Kateri Tekakwitha Parish – Parish formed in late 2012 from the merger of the Church of Our Lady of Fatima (2216 Rosa Road in Schenectady) and St. Helen's Church (1803 Union St in Niskayuna)
- St. Luke's Church (1235 State St.) – Established in 1916
- St. Madeleine Sophie Church (Guilderland) – Established in 1947
- St. Mary's Church (Crescent) – Established in 1927; formerly a mission of St. Patrick's Church in Cohoes

== Notes ==
†. Parish practices the Extraordinary Form
