= St. Francis de Sales School =

St Francis De Sales School may refer to:

- St. Francis De Sales School (New Delhi), India
- St Francis De Sales School, in Island Bay, New Zealand
- St. Francis de Sales School (Toledo, Ohio), U.S.

== See also ==
- St. Francis de Sales High School (disambiguation)
- St. Francis De Sales Regional Catholic School
