= St. Francis de Sales' Church =

St. Francis de Sales Church or Saint Francis de Sales Catholic Church may refer to:

== United States ==
- St. Francis de Sales, a church in the East Dade Deanery of Miami, Florida
- St. Francis de Sales Catholic Church (Mableton, Georgia)
- St. Francis de Sales Church (Keokuk, Iowa)
- St. Francis de Sales Catholic Church (Paducah, Kentucky)
- St. Francis de Sales Church (Norton Shores, Michigan)
- St. Francis de Sales Church (St. Louis, Missouri)
- St. Francis de Sales Roman Catholic Church (Buffalo, New York)
- St. Francis deSales Church (Geneva, New York), Catholic church
- St. Francis de Sales Catholic Church (Lexington, New York)
- St. Francis de Sales Roman Catholic Church (Manhattan, NYC)
- Saint Francis De Sales Catholic Church (Cincinnati, Ohio)
- St. Francis de Sales Chapel, a church in the Roman Catholic Diocese of Toledo
- St. Francis de Sales Roman Catholic Church (Philadelphia), Pennsylvania
- St Francis de Sales Church, in the Queens Chapel neighborhood of Washington, D.C.

== Elsewhere ==
- St. Francis de Sales Roman Catholic Church (Ajax, Ontario), a Catholic church in Canada
- St Francis de Sales' Church, in Wash Common, Newbury, Berkshire, England
- St Francis de Sales, Hampton Hill and Upper Teddington, London, England

== See also ==
- Oblates of St. Francis de Sales
- Cathedral of St. Francis de Sales (disambiguation)
