= Saint Francis High School =

Saint Francis High School or St. Francis High School may refer to:

- Saint Francis High School (Calgary), Alberta, Canada

United States (sorted by state):

- Saint Francis High School (La Cañada Flintridge, California)
- Saint Francis High School (Mountain View, California)
- St. Francis High School (Sacramento, California), an all-female college preparatory school
- Saint Francis Central Coast Catholic High School, Watsonville, California
- St. Francis High School (Gainesville, Florida), renamed St. Francis Catholic Academy in 2016
- St. Francis Schools (Alpharetta, Georgia), grades K-12 in Alpharetta, Georgia
- Saint Francis School (Hawaii), grades PK–12 in Honolulu, Hawaii
- St. Francis High School (Wheaton, Illinois)
- Saint Francis High School (Louisville), Kentucky
- St. Francis High School (Traverse City, Michigan)
- Saint Francis High School (Saint Francis, Minnesota)
- St. Francis High School (Humphrey, Nebraska)
- Saint Francis High School (Athol Springs), New York
- St. Francis Preparatory School, Queens, New York
- St. Francis High School (St. Francis, Wisconsin)

== See also ==
- List of schools named after Francis Xavier
- St. Francis Borgia Regional High School, Washington, Missouri
- St. Francis de Sales High School (disambiguation)
