= Cathedral of St. Francis de Sales =

Cathedral of St. Francis de Sales or St. Francis de Sales Cathedral may refer to:

== India ==
- St. Francis de Sales Cathedral, Nagpur
- St. Francis de Sales Cathedral (Aurangabad, Maharashtra)

== United States ==
- Cathedral of Saint Francis de Sales (Oakland, California)
- Cathedral of St. Francis de Sales (Houma, Louisiana)
- Saint Francis de Sales Cathedral (Baker City, Oregon)

== See also ==
- St. Francis de Sales' Church (disambiguation)
- Francis de Sales (disambiguation)
