= List of churches in the Archdiocese of Miami =

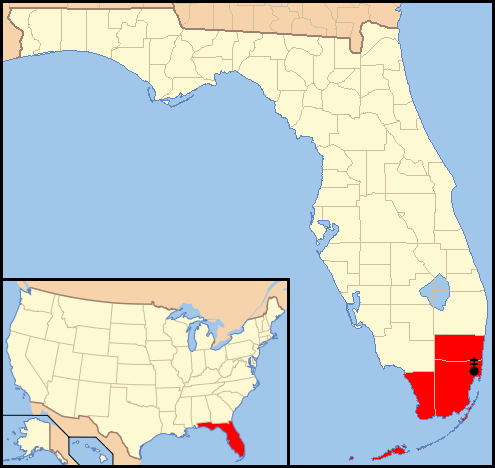
Archdiocese of Miami in red

This article is a list of current and former Roman Catholic churches in the Roman Catholic Archdiocese of Miami in Florida. It also includes a list of Eastern Rite Catholic churches within the archdiocese.

The cathedral church of the archdiocese is the Cathedral of Mary in Miami. The archdiocese includes 118 Roman Catholic parishes and missions divided into 10 deaneries in Miami-Dade, Broward and Monroe Counties.

Historic parishes in the archdiocese include

- Basilica of St. Mary Star of the Sea (1846) in Key West, the oldest parish in the archdiocese
- Gesu Church (1896) in Miami, the oldest parish in Miami-Dade County
- St. Anthony Church (1921) in Fort Lauderdale, the oldest parish in Broward County
- St. Patrick Church (1929) in Miami Beach, the oldest parish in Miami Beach

== Cathedral ==
Name	Image	Location	Description/Notes
Cathedral of Saint Mary		7525 NW. 2nd Ave, Miami	Ground broken in 1955, dedicated in 1957

== Miami-Dade County ==
The archdiocese has five deaneries in Miami-Dade County.

=== East Dade Deanery ===
This list contains parishes in Miami, Miami Beach and other communities.

Name	Image	Location	Description/Notes
Corpus Christi		3220 NW. 7th Ave, Miami	Founded in 1941, current church dedicated in 1959
Gesu		118 NE. 2nd St, Miami	Dedicated in 1896, it is the oldest Catholic church in Miami. Listed on NRHP in 1974.
St. Agnes		100 Harbor Dr, Key Biscayne	Founded in 1952. Current church dedicated in 1954
St. Augustine Church & Student Center		1400 Miller Rd, Coral Gables	Serves the University of Miami community
St. Francis de Sales		621 Alton Rd, Miami Beach	Original chapel built in 1940 as a mission church, became a parish in 1964
St. Francis Xavier		1698 NW. 4th Ave, Miami	Founded in 1927, merged with Gesu Parish in 2009
St. Hugh		3460 Royal Rd, Coconut Grove	Established in 1959. Church built in 1960.
St. John Bosco		1349 W. Flagler St, Miami	Established in 1962. Current church dedicated in 1965.
St. Kieran		3605 S. Miami Ave, Miami	Established in 1967. Current church dedicated in 1970s.
St. Michael the Archangel		2987 W. Flagler St, Miami	Established in 1946.
St. Patrick		3716 Garden Ave, Miami Beach	Church dedicated in 1929
Ss. Peter & Paul		900 SW. 26th Rd, Miami	Romantic style church, dedicated in 1940
St. Raymond		3475 SW. 17th St, Miami	Current church dedicated in 1972

=== Northeast Dade Deanery ===
This list contains parishes in Miami, North Miami and other communities.

Name	Image	Location	Description/Notes
Holy Family		14500 NE. 11th Ave, North Miami	Founded in 1959, church dedicated in 1967
Holy Redeemer		1301 NW. 71st St, Miami	Parish found in the 1940s for Black Catholics, church dedicated in 1950
Notre Dame D'Haiti		110 NE, 62nd St, Miami	Founded as mission in 1980s
St. James		540 NW. 132nd St, North Miami	Founded in 1952, church dedicated in 1963
St. Joseph		8670 Byron Ave, Miami Beach	Founded in 1947
St. Lawrence		2200 NE. 191st St, Miami	Founded in 1956
St. Martha		9221 Biscayne Blvd, Miami Shores	Founded in 1970, church dedicated in 1983
St. Mary Magdalen		17775 North Bay Rd, Sunny Isles Beach	Founded in 1955, church dedicated in 1957
St. Philip Neri		15700 NW. 20th Ave, Miami Gardens	Founded as mission in the 1940s for Black Catholics, church dedicated in 1954
St. Rose of Lima		415 NE 105th St, Miami	Founded in 1948. church dedicated in 1961
Visitation		100 NE. 191st St, Miami	Founded in 1956

=== Northwest Dade Deanery ===
This list contains parishes in Hialeah, Miami and other communities.

Name	Image	Location	Description/Notes
Blessed Trinity		4020 Curtiss Pkwy, Virginia Gardens	Founded in 1953, church consecrated in 1958
Immaculate Conception		4497 W. 1st Ave, Hialeah	Founded as mission in 1954, church dedicated in 1964
Mother of Our Redeemer		8445 NW. 186th St, Miami	Founded in 1988
Our Lady of Guadalupe		11691 NW. 25th St, Doral	Founded in 2001, church dedicated in 2015
Our Lady of the Lakes		15801 NW. 67th Ave, Miami Lakes	Founded in 1967, church dedicated in 1987
San Lazaro		4400 W. 18th Ave, Hialeah	Founded in 1982, church dedicated in 1987
Santa Barbara		6801 W. 30th Ave, Hialeah	Founded in 1987, church dedicated in 2000
St. Benedict		701 W. 77th St, Hialeah	Founded in 1973, church dedicated in 1980
St. Cecilia		1040 W. 29th St, Hialeah	Founded in 1971, church dedicated in 1996. Parish closed between 2009 and 2011. Parish also houses Redemptoris Mater Seminary
St. John the Apostle		475 E. 4th St, Hialeah	Founded in 1945, church consecrated in 1963
St. Monica		3490 NW. 191st St, Carol City	Founded in 1959, church dedicated in 1961

=== South Dade Deanery ===
This list contains parishes in Miami, Homestead and other communities.

Name	Image	Location	Description/Notes
Christ the King		16000 SW. 112th Ave, Perrine	Founded in 1950s, church dedicated in 1962
Epiphany		8235 SW. 57th Ave, Miami	Founded in 1951
Our Lady of Lourdes		11291 SW. 142nd St, Miami	Founded in 1985, church dedicated in 2002.
Our Lady of the Holy Rosary-St. Richard		7500 SW. 152nd St, Palmetto Bay	Founded in 2010 with merger of Our Lady of the Holy Rosary and St. Richard Parishes
Sacred Heart		106 SE. 1st Dr, Homestead	Founded in 1929, church dedicated in the 1910s
St. Ann Mission		Princeton	Founded in 1961 to serve migrant farm workers.
St. Catherine of Siena		9200 SW. 107th Ave, Miami	Founded in 1968, church dedicated in 1974
St. Joachim		19150 SW. 117th Ave, Miami	Founded in 1972
St. John Neumann		12125 SW. 107th Ave, Miami	Founded in 1980, church dedicated in 1990
St. Louis		7270 SW. 120th St, Pinecrest	Founded in 1963
St. Martin de Porres		14881 SW. 288th St, Leisure City	Founded in 1990, church dedicated in 1999

=== West Dade Deanery ===
This list contains parishes in Miami.

	Image	Location	Description/Notes
Good Shepherd		14187 SW. 72nd St, Miami	Founded in 1977, church dedicated in 1995
Mother of Christ		14141 SW. 26th St, Miami	Founded in 1983
Our Lady of Divine Providence		10205 W. Flagler St, Miami	Founded in 1975
Prince of Peace		12800 NW. 6th St, Miami	Founded in 1987, church dedicated in 1999
St. Agatha		1111 SW. 107th Ave, Miami	Founded in 1971, church dedicated in 1978
St. Brendan		8725 SW. 32nd St, Miami	Founded in 1954
St. Dominic		5909 NW. 7th St, Miami	Current church dedicated in 1981
St. Kevin		12525 SW. 42nd St, Miami	Founded in 1963
St. Thomas the Apostle		7377 SW. 64th St, Miami	Founded in 1959, church dedicated in 1964
St. Timothy		5400 SW. 102nd Ave, Miami	Founded in 1960

== Broward County ==
The archdiocese has four deaneries in Broward County.

=== Northeast Broward Deanery ===
This list contains parishes in Fort Lauderdale, Pompano Beach and other communities.

Name	Image	Location	Description/Notes
Assumption		2001 S. Ocean Blvd, Lauderdale-By-The-Sea	Founded in 1959
Blessed Sacrament		1701 E Oakland Park Blvd, Fort Lauderdale	Founded in 1960, church dedicated in 1963
Our Lady of Czestochowa Mission		2400 NE. 12th St, Pompano Beach	Founded as mission in 1983 for Polish immigrants, church dedicated in 1997
St. Ambrose		380 S. Federal Hwy, Deerfield Beach	Founded in 1962, church dedicated in 1964
St. Anthony		901 NE. 2nd St, Fort Lauderdale	Oldest Catholic church in the county, founded in 1921.
St. Clement		2795 N. Andrews Ave, Wilton Manors	Founded in 1954, church dedicated in 1955
St. Coleman		1200 S. Federal Hwy, Pompano Beach	Founded in 1959, church dedicated in 1960
St. Elizabeth of Hungary		3331 NE. 10 Ter, Pompano Beach	Founded in 1959, church dedicated in 1990
St. Gabriel		731 N. Ocean Blvd, Pompano Beach	Founded in 1967, church dedicated that same year
St. John the Baptist		4595 Bayview Dr, Fort Lauderdale	Founded in 1969, church dedicated in 1971
St. Paul the Apostle		2700 NE. 36th St, Lighthouse Point	Founded in 1964, church dedicated in 1971
St. Pius X		2511 N. Ocean Blvd, Fort Lauderdale	Founded in 1959, church dedicated in 1960

=== Northwest Broward Deanery ===
This list contains parishes and missions in Coral Springs, Pompano Beach and other communities.

Name	Image	Location	Description/Notes
All Saints		10900 West Oakland Park Blvd, Sunrise	Founded in 1982, church dedicated in 1995
Mary Help of Christians		5980 N. University Dr, Parkland	Founded in 1989, church dedicated in 1996
Our Lady of Mercy		5201 N. Military Trl, Deerfield Beach	Parish founded in 1974, church dedicated in 1982
Our Lady Queen of Heaven		1400 S. State Rd. 7, North Lauderdale	Founded in 1974, church dedicated in 1979
Our Lady Queen of Martyrs		2731 SW. 11th Ct, Fort Lauderdale	Founded in 1956, church dedicated in 1957
San Isidro Mission		2310 Martin Luther King Blvd, Pompano Beach	Founded as mission in 1970 for migrant farm workers
St. Andrew		9950 NW. 29th St, Coral Springs	Founded in 1969, is one of the largest parishes in the archdiocese
St. Bernard		8279 Sunset Strip, Sunrise,	Founded in 1971, church dedicated in 1974
St. Elizabeth Ann Seton		1401 Coral Ridge Dr, Coral Springs	Founded in 1985, church dedicated in 1989
St. Gregory the Great		200 N. University Dr, Plantation	Founded in 1959, dedicated in 1982
St. Helen		3033 NW 33rd Ave, Fort Lauderdale	Founded in 1968, church dedicated in 1970
St. Henry		1500 S. Andrews Ave, Pompano Beach	Founded in 1969, church dedicated in 1974
St. Malachy		6200 N. University Dr, Tamarac	Founded in 1971
St. Vincent		6350 NW. 18th St, Margate	Founded in 1960, church dedicated in 1980

=== Southeast Broward Deanery ===
This list contains parishes and missions in Hollywood, Fort Lauderdale and other communities.

Name	Image	Location	Description/Notes
Annunciation		3781 SW 39th St, West Hollywood	Founded in 1959, church dedicated in 1963
Church of the Little Flower		2711 Indian Mound Trl, Coral Gables	Current church built in 1951
Nativity		5220 Johnson St, Hollywood	Founded in 1960, church dedicated in 1968
Our Lady of La Vang		123 NW. 6th Ave, Hallandale	Founded in 2023 for Vietnamese Catholics
St. Jerome		2533 SW. 9th Ave, Fort Lauderdale	Founded as mission in 1960, church dedicated in 1961
St. Matthew		542 Blue Heron Dr, Hallandale Beach	Founded in 1969, church dedicated in 1961
St. Maurice at Resurrection		441 NE. 2nd St, Dania Beach	Founded in 2002, merged with Resurrection Parish in 2009
St. Paul Chung Ha Sang Mission (Korean)		3600 SW. 32 Blvd, West Park	Founded in 1984
St. Sebastian		2000 Marietta Dr, Fort Lauderdale	Founded in 1959
St. Stephen		6044 SW. 19th St, Miramar	Founded in 1956

=== Southwest Broward Deanery ===
This list contains parishes in Miramar, Pembroke Pines and other communities.

Name	Image	Location	Description/Notes
St. Bartholomew		8005 Miramar Pkwy, Miramar	Founded in 1962, church started in 1964
St. Bernadette		7450 Stirling Rd, Hollywood	Founded in 1959, church dedicated in 1961
St. Bonaventure		1301 SW. 136th Ave, Davie	Founded in 1985, church dedicated in 2004
St. Boniface		8330 Johnson St, Pembroke Pines	Founded in 1971, church dedicated in 1976
St. David		3900 S. University Dr, Davie	Founded in 1974, church started in 1979
St. Edward		19000 Pines Blvd, Pembroke Pines	Founded in 1995, current church dedicated in 2000
St. John XXIII		16800 Miramar Pkwy, Miramar	Founded in 2002
St. Katherine Drexel		2501 S. Post Rd, Weston	Founded in 2001, church dedicated in 2014
St. Mark the Evangelist		5601 South Flamingo Rd, Southwest Ranches	Founded in 2002
St. Maximillian Kolbe		701 N. Hiatus Rd, Pembroke Pines	Founded in 1983, dedicated in 1994

== Monroe Deanery ==
The archdiocese has one deanery in Monroe County, containing all the parishes in the Florida Keys region.

Name	Image	Location	Description/Notes
Basilica of St. Mary Star of the Sea		1010 Windsor Ln, Key West	Founded in 1846, it is the oldest parish in the archdiocese and the second oldest parish in Florida. Current Victorian Gothic church built in 1905
San Pablo		550 122nd St, Marathon	Elevated to parish status in 1958
San Pedro		89500 Overseas Hwy, Tavernier	Founded in 1952 as "Upper Keys Mission", current church dedicated in 1955
St. Justin Martyr		105500 Overseas Hwy, Key Largo	Founded in 1970. Current church dedicated in 1992.
St. Peter the Fisherman		31300 Overseas Hwy, Big Pine Key	Founded as mission in 1957, became a parish in 1969.

== Shrines ==
Name	Image	Location	Description/Notes
Our Lady of Charity National Shrine		3609 S. Miami Ave, Miami	Marian Shrine built by Cuban immigrants. Dedicated in 1973

== Former parishes ==
This is a list of parishes and missions that have been closed or merged into other parishes.

Name	Image	Location	Description/Notes
Divine Mercy Haitian Mission		1105 NW. 6th Ave, Fort Lauderdale	Founded in 1963, now part of St. Matthew Parish. Church closed
Our Lady Aparecide (Brazilian Apostolate)		1618 Polk St, Hollywood	Founded in 1996, merged with St. Vincent Parish. Now closed
Our Lady of Perpetual Help		13401 NW. 28th Ave, Opa Locka	Founded in 1954, merged with St. James Parish in 2009. Now closed
Resurrection		441 NE. 2nd St, Dania	Founded in 1958, merged with St. Maurice, now St. Maurice at Resurrection Parish.
St. Charles Borromeo		123 NW. 6th Ave, Hallandale	Founded in 1968, merged with St. Matthew Parish in 2009. Now closed
St. George		3640 NW. 8th St, Fort Lauderdale	Founded in 1964, Merged with Our Lady Queen of Martyrs Parish in 2009
St. Joseph Haitian Mission		1210 NW. 6th Ave, Pompano Beach	Founded in 1983, now operated by St. Elizabeth of Hungary Parish
St. Luke		2370 Hammock Blvd, Coconut Creek	Founded in 1985, merged with St. Vincent in 2009. Now closed
St. Robert Bellarmine		3405 NW. 27th Ave, Miami	Founded in 1968, now a mission for Corpus Christi Parish

== Eastern Catholic parishes ==
Name	Image	Location	Description/Notes
Assumption of the Blessed Virgin Mary		39 NW. 57th Ct, Miami	Founded in 1953, Ukrainian Catholic Church
Heart of Jesus		1800 NE. 6th Ct, Fort Lauderdale	Maronite Rite Eastern Catholic Church
Our Lady of Health		201 N. University Dr, Coral Springs	Syro-Malabar Rite, the only Velamkanni Matha Parish in North America
Our Lady of Lebanon		2055 Coral Way, Miami	Founded in 1973, Maronite Rite church
Our Lady of the Sign		7311 Lyons Rd, Coconut Creek	Ruthenian Byzantine Catholic Church, founded in 1984. Church dedicated in 1989
St. Basil the Great		1475 NE. 199th St, Miami	Byzantine
St. Jude		126 SE. 15th Rd, Miami	Melkite Greek Catholic church, parish founded in 1970s, church dedicated in 1978
St. Jude Knanaya		1105 NW. 6th Ave, Fort Lauderdale	Syro-Malabar Rite church
