= St. Dominic Catholic Church (Miami) =

Church in Miami, Florida, US

Coordinates: 25°46′42″N 80°17′29″W

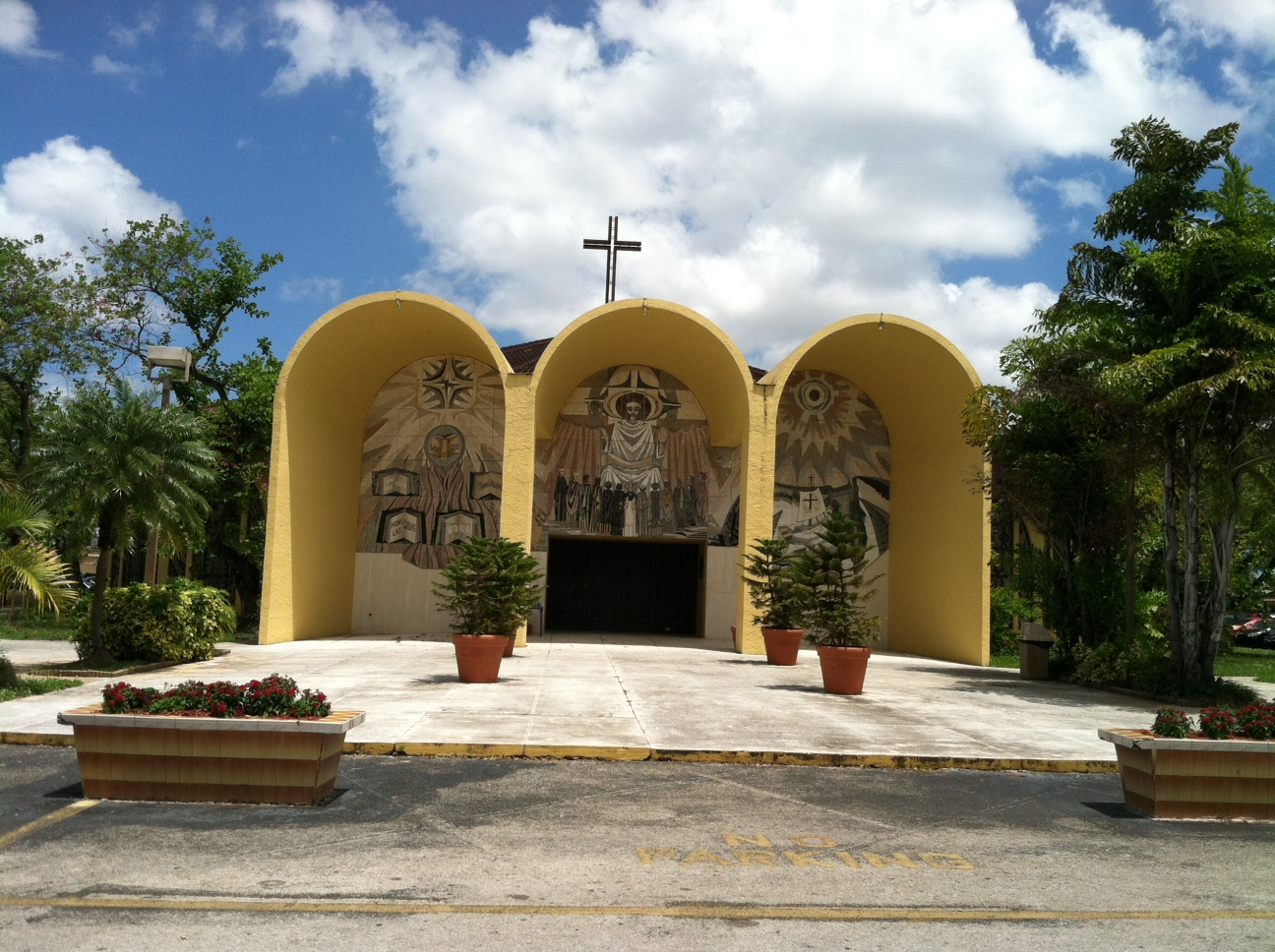
Main entrance to the church

St. Dominic Catholic Church is a Catholic Church in Miami, Florida. It is part of the Roman Catholic Archdiocese of Miami and consists of 118 parishes, spanning Coral Springs in the north and Key West, Florida in the south.

== History ==
St. Dominic Catholic Church was established on May 20, 1962, named in honor of Saint Dominic of Guzman, a 13th-century Catholic saint and founder of the religious Order of Preachers. It is located in 5909 NW 7th Street in Miami.

When the church was being established, the religious looked at possible permanent sites. In 1963, they acquired several buildings that were up for demolition. After renovations had been completed, the site comprised the first church, rectory, and school of religion. In 1968, the Dominican Monastery in downtown Miami closed and the priests moved to St. Dominic, effectively creating its current priory.

In 1971, the church expanded and a statue and shrine of Our Lady of the Rosary was added. In Summer 1979, the Archbishop Edward A. McCarthy placed the cornerstone of the church, which was dedicated on March 15, 1981. In August 2011, the stone altar was consecrated by Archbishop of Miami Thomas Wenski.

== Dominicans in the US ==
At first, the Spanish friars of Spain staffed St. Dominic parish, but in 1980, the pastoral care of the parish was entrusted to the Dominicans of the newly established Southern Province of St. Martin de Porres. Although the presence of Spanish Dominican Friars in Florida dates to the mid-16th century, the Dominicans were formally established in the U.S. in 1805 by Fr. Edward Dominic Fenwick, OP. Since then, their presence and ministry have grown. Today, the Dominican Friars have four provinces in the U.S. St. Martin de Porres, the Southern Province, forms part of the four. The Dominican Friars who staff St. Dominic Catholic Church have been running it since the church was first established in 1962.

== Four Provinces of Dominican Friars ==
1. St. Martin de Porres Province (Southern United States)
2. St. Joseph the Worker Province (Eastern United States)
3. Holy Name of Jesus Province (Western United States)
4. St. Albert the Great Province (Central United States)

== The Parish ==
The early history of St. Dominic parish is tied to the history of the Diocese of Miami, which was created in August 1958 with the parish being created in May 1962. Both experienced tumultuous times in their early years. Just 90 miles away, Cuba had experienced its Communist revolution, thus creating an influx of Cuban refugees. Black Americans were struggling for their civil rights, the Vietnam War was in process, and Vatican II had just “opened (its) windows” to Christ. This led to St. Dominic's experiencing a “storm of change” and expansion during its early years.

Parishioners have included natives and settlers from the Northern U.S., the Caribbean, Central America, and South America. In its beginnings, St. Dominic parish served primarily an Anglo community. In the 2020s, the parish now serves a primarily Hispanic population.

There are currently many church groups and movements within the parish of St. Dominic, including Emaus, Cursillos de Cristiandad, CCD (religious education), RCIA (adult religious education and preparation for the sacraments), Grupo de Oración (prayer group part of the Charismatic Renovation), and the FIRST Catholic Action group in the US. Ministries include music (both choral and show choirs), Ministers of the Word and Ministers of the Eucharist.

== Architecture and art ==
St. Dominic's layout is semi-circular in nature. On the church's exterior there are 10 stained glass windows in the shape of arches depicting important themes in Catholicism. The entrance of the church consists of three major arches, and underneath each arch, there is a stone mosaic. The first mosaic from the left depicts the Dominican theologians that were important in the New World. The second and middle mosaic depicts Jesus "blessing and sending the 12 (Apostles) to announce the Good News" and St. Dominic welcoming the onlooker. The third mosaic on the right depicts a "boat bringing the first missionaries to the Florida peninsula." Both the stained glass windows and the arched mosaics were produced by the same artist, Father Domingo Iturgaiz from Navarre, Spain.

The church roof is in the shape of a triangular spire and its summit contains an iron cross that is illuminated at night. “Scalloping waves of barrel tiles” cover the roof. The seating arrangement is also semi-circular and accommodates 850 persons. There are six aisles that lead to the main altar. The altar area includes a baptismal font and an ambo (pulpit). On the back wall of the sanctuary hangs a cross and two statues, one of Mary and one of St. Joseph. Alongside the walls with the stained glass windows are the Stations of the Cross by Spanish artist Jose Luis Coomonte.

== Church pastors ==
1. Fr. Angel Viscarra, O.P.
2. Fr. Isidoro Vicente, O.P.
3. Fr. Restituto Perez, O.P.
4. Fr. Alberto Rodriguez, O.P. (1986–1993)
5. Fr. Jorge Presmanez, O.P. (1993–2003)
6. Fr. Alberto Rodriguez, O.P. (2003–2015)
7. Fr. Eduardo Logiste, O.P. (2015–2025)
8. Fr. Orlando Cardozo, O.P. (2025–present)

== Gallery ==
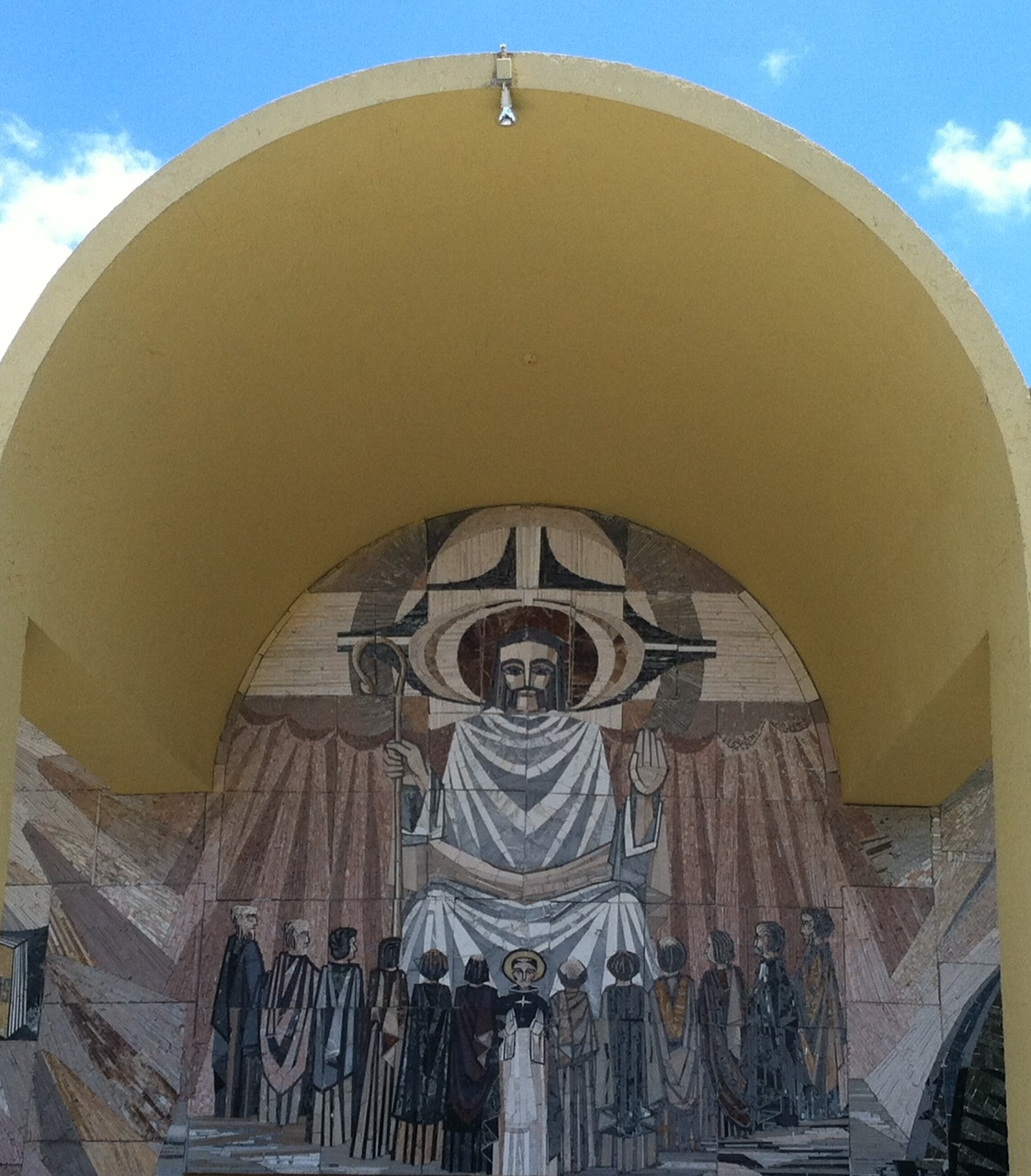
Mosaic 1 in the middle

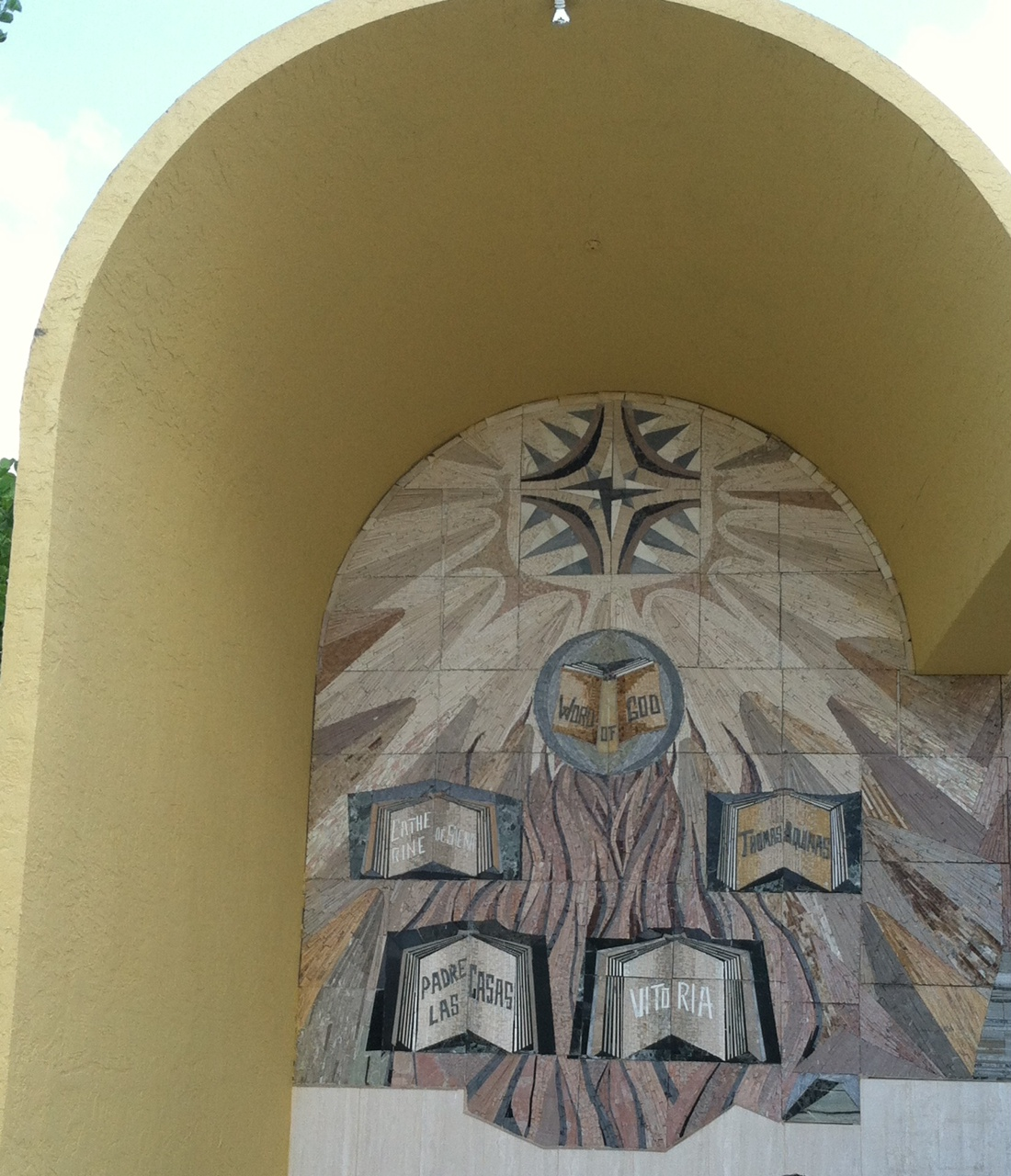
Mosaic 2 on the left

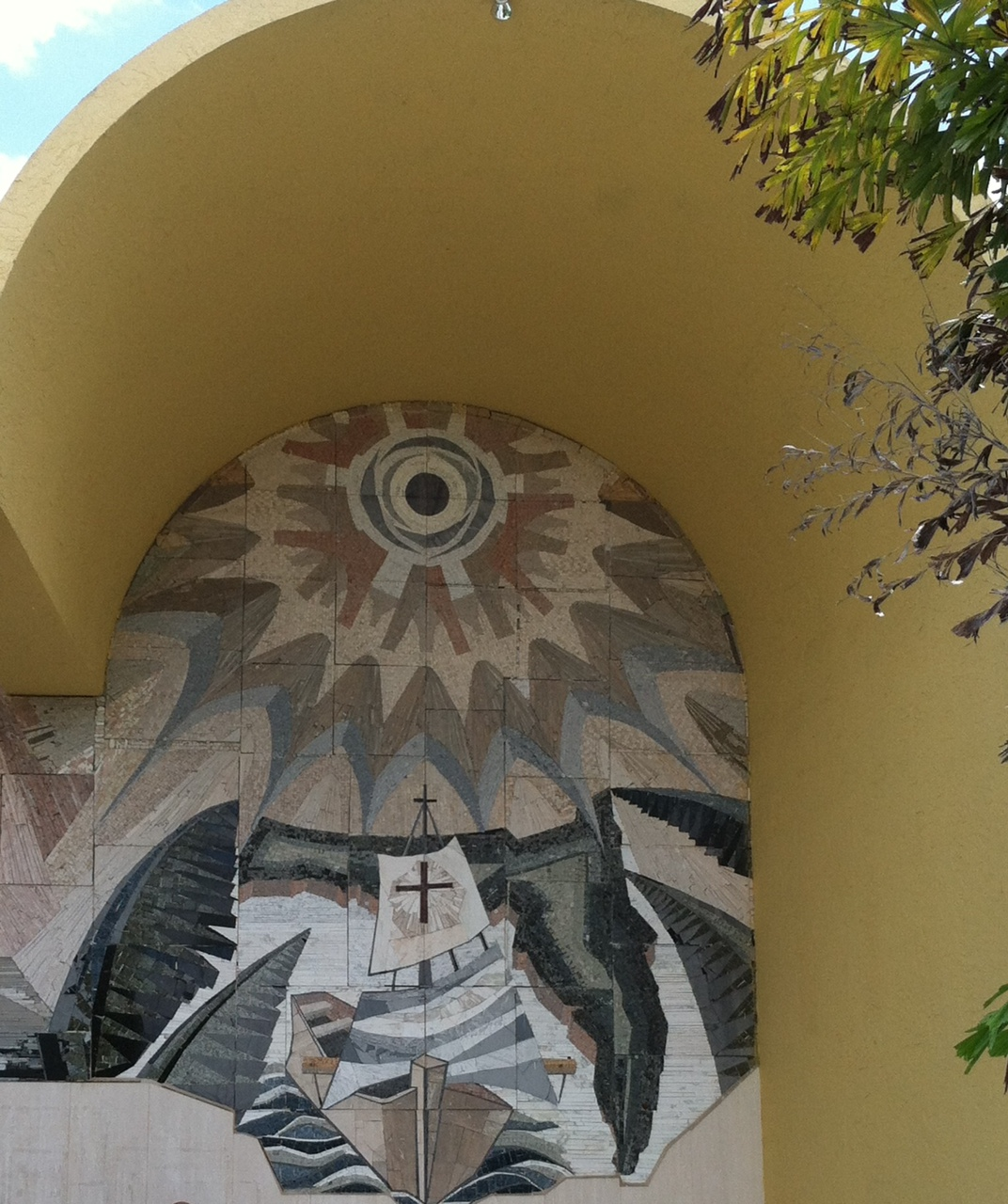
Mosaic 3 on the right

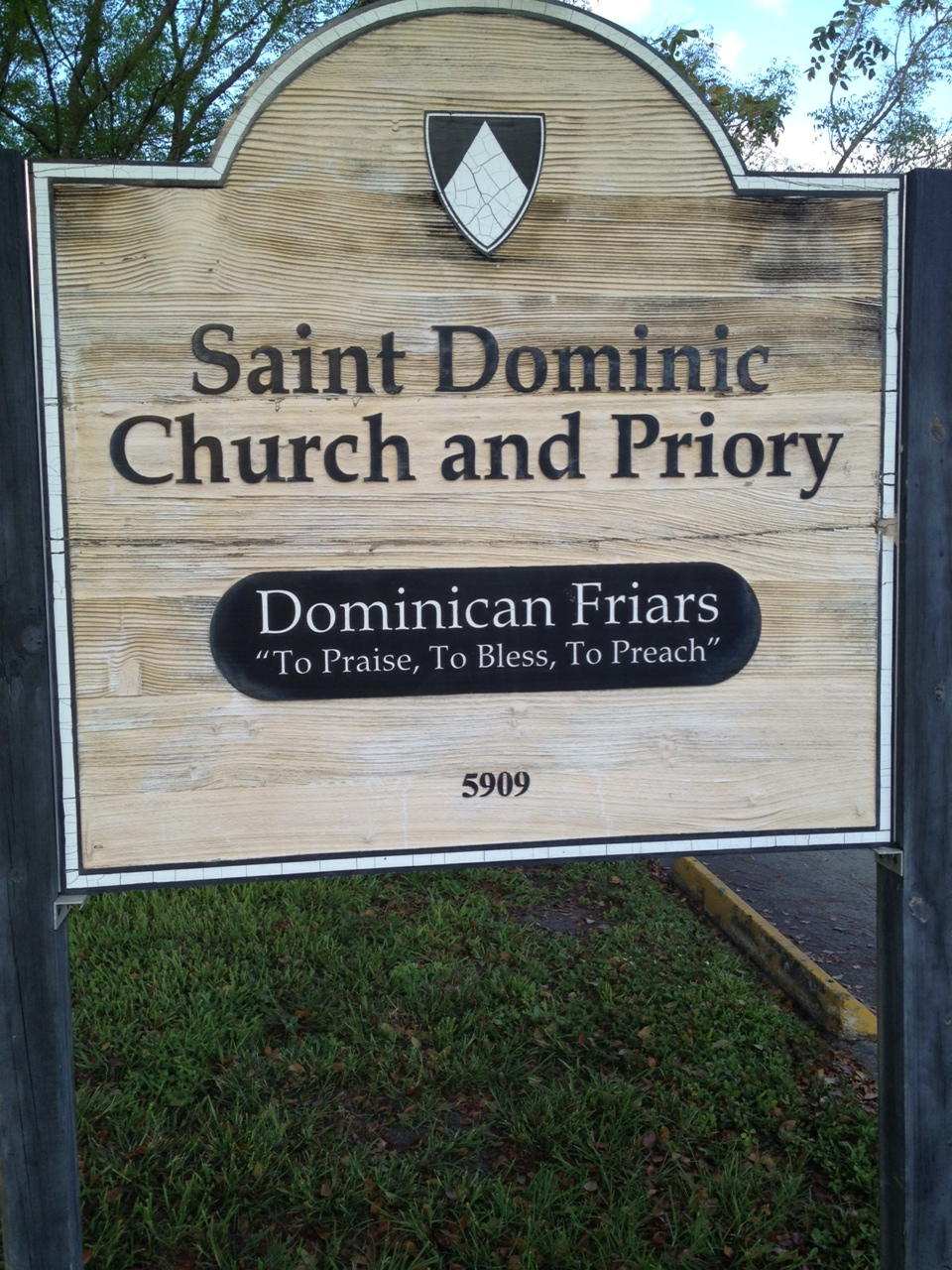
Sign and motto
