= St. Francis de Sales High School =

St. Francis de Sales High School or DeSales High School may refer to various Catholic high schools named for Francis de Sales:

- St. Francis De'Sales High School, Nagpur, Maharashtra, India
- St. Francis de Sales High School (Chicago, Illinois)
- DeSales High School (Louisville, Kentucky)
- Vandebilt Catholic High School, Louisiana; formerly named St. Francis de Sales Catholic High School
- St. Francis de Sales High School (Detroit, Michigan)
- DeSales High School (Geneva, New York)
- St. Francis DeSales High School (Columbus, Ohio)
- St. Francis de Sales School (Toledo, Ohio)
- St. Francis de Sales High School (Virginia)
- Desales Catholic High School (Walla Walla, Washington)

== See also ==
- St. Francis de Sales School (disambiguation)
- Saint Francis High School (disambiguation)
