= St. Clements Roman Catholic Church (Saratoga Springs, New York) =

Coordinates: 43°5′5.92″N 73°45′57.01″W

St. Clement's Parish
- St. Clement's Parish
- Location: 231 Lake Avenue; Saratoga Springs, New York
- Country: United States
- Denomination: Roman Catholic
- Website: www.stclementschurch.com

History
- Status: Active
- Founded: 1917
- Dedication: Clemens Mary Hofbauer
- Dedicated: November 25, 1918

Administration
- Province: New York
- Diocese: Albany

Clergy
- Archbishop: Timothy Cardinal Dolan
- Bishop: Edward Bernard Scharfenberger
- Pastor: The Rev. James E. Ebert

St. Clement's Parish is a Roman Catholic parish in Saratoga Springs, New York in the United States under the authority of the Diocese of Albany. Founded under the patronage of Clemens Mary Hofbauer and was staffed by clergy of the Congregation of the Most Holy Redeemer (the Redemptorists) from its founding in 1917 until 2018.

== History ==
In 1916, the parish of St. Peter's, which had been established in 1834 to serve the whole of Saratoga Springs, was split along Broadway. The new parish of St. Clement's was formally opened the following year, when the first Catholic Mass in the parish church was celebrated on opening day, October 14, 1917. Bishop Edmund Gibbons dedicated the church, and thus the parish, to Clement Maria Hofbauer on November 25, 1918. Masses were originally held in the basement of nearby St. Clements School.

The parish serves Catholics on the East Side of the City of Saratoga Springs, as well as in the neighboring Town of Wilton. St. Clement's created the mission church of St. Therese in Gansevoort out of the local Grange hall in 1965; the first Mass was celebrated there on September 18, 1966. After fifty years at its original location, a new building was constructed at its current location and opened in 1967, the 50th anniversary of the parish's foundation.

== School ==
The Catholic school is first mentioned in parish records in August 1918. The school operated the School Sisters of Notre Dame, who lived in nearby buildings until a convent was constructed in 1931. St. Clement's Regional Catholic School continues to serve Pre-Kindergarten through fifth grade. The current principal is Jane Kromm.
