= St. Francis de Sales Catholic Church (Lexington, New York) =

Historic church in New York, United States

- St. Francis DeSales Church
- U.S. National Register of Historic Places
- Location within New York Location within the United States
- Location: Church St., Lexington, New York
- Coordinates: 42°14′20″N 74°21′41″W
- Area: less than one acre
- Built: 1895
- Architectural style: Late Gothic Revival
- NRHP reference No.: 99001485
- Added to NRHP: December 9, 1999

St. Francis DeSales Church is a historic Roman Catholic church on Church Street in Lexington, Greene County, New York. It was completed in 1895 and is a one-story, four by one bay light frame structure on a stone and concrete foundation. It features a steeply pitched gable roof, narrow clapboard sheathing, and an enclosed porch.

It was added to the National Register of Historic Places in 1999.
