= St. Francis De Sales Regional Catholic School =

Catholic school in New York, United States

Coordinates: 43.025491°N 74.991936°W

Information
- Religious affiliation: Catholicism
- Grades: Pre-K - Grade 6

St. Francis de Sales Regional Catholic School is a Roman Catholic middle school in Herkimer, New York. It is the only Catholic school in Herkimer County. The current school principal is Sister Nellie Crique.

The school was originally included Kindergarten through Grade 8. In 1999, the school expanded, allowing for a Pre-Kindergarten to be set up. After the 2005–06 academic year, the school was contracted, eliminating Grades 7 and 8 due to lack of enrollment. The school currently operates as a Pre-K.

== Athletics ==
St. Francis de Sales also has a basketball team. Organized in 1997–98, home games are played on the court in the St. Francis de Sales Parish Center in Herkimer, New York. The St. Francis Patriots are members of the Catholic Youth Organization (CYO) basketball program. Teams are formed by age and gender for grades 3 through 6. Before the school's contraction, the 7th and 8th graders together had a team. The CYO season runs through the winter months.

The best overall year for the St. Francis 7th and 8th grade team came in the 2000–01 season, when the team made it to the CYO Central New York Championship game against St. John's of New Hartford. After three overtimes, the Patriots fell to St. John's. and they did not reach the championship game in any other year after that.

== Parish Ties ==
St. Francis de Sales is owned and partially funded by the parish of St. Francis de Sales in Herkimer, New York. The current pastor is Father Mark Cunningham.

== Cooperation with the Herkimer Central School District ==
In the fall of the 2004–05 academic year, the Herkimer Central School District allowed St. Francis de Sales 7th and 8th graders to participate in Herkimer High School modified athletics.

Other services provided by the Herkimer Central School District are:

School Bus Transportation Remedial Teachers and Remedial Aides Speech Therapist Psychologist Social Worker Phys. Assistant Nurses
