= Sisters of Charity =

Name for Roman Catholic religious communities

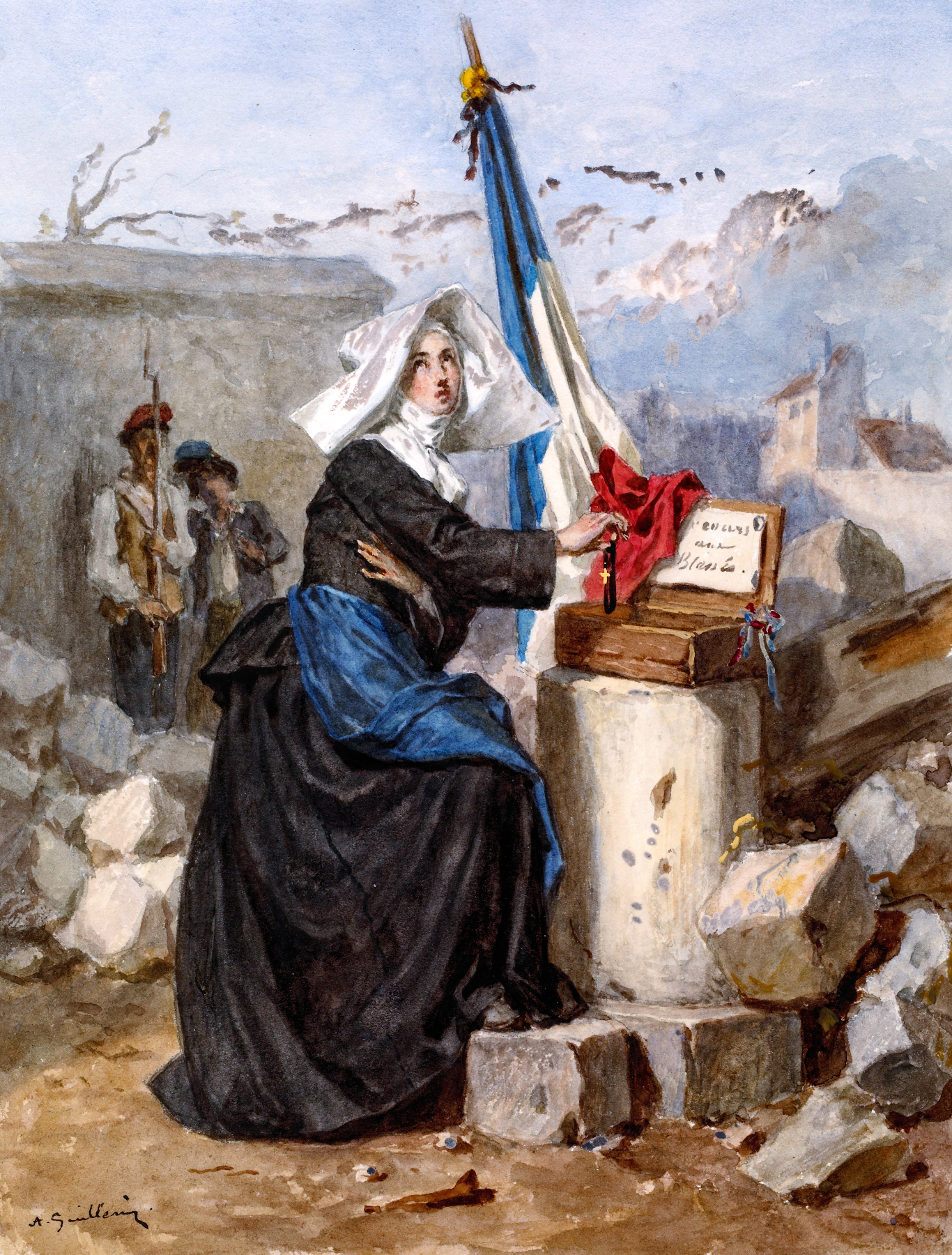
Aid for the Wounded (Sister of Charity), by Alexandre-Marie Guillemin, c. 1865. Walters Art Museum.

The Sisters of Charity is a name used by various Roman Catholic religious communities of women dedicated to serving the poor, sick, and marginalized. While some communities trace their origins to the Vincentian tradition founded in the 17th century by Saint Vincent de Paul, others developed independently around the world. In the United States, several communities follow the tradition established by Saint Elizabeth Ann Seton, the first native-born American saint. Over time, the rule of Saint Vincent de Paul has influenced at least sixty religious institutes for women globally.

== Vincentian-Setonian tradition ==
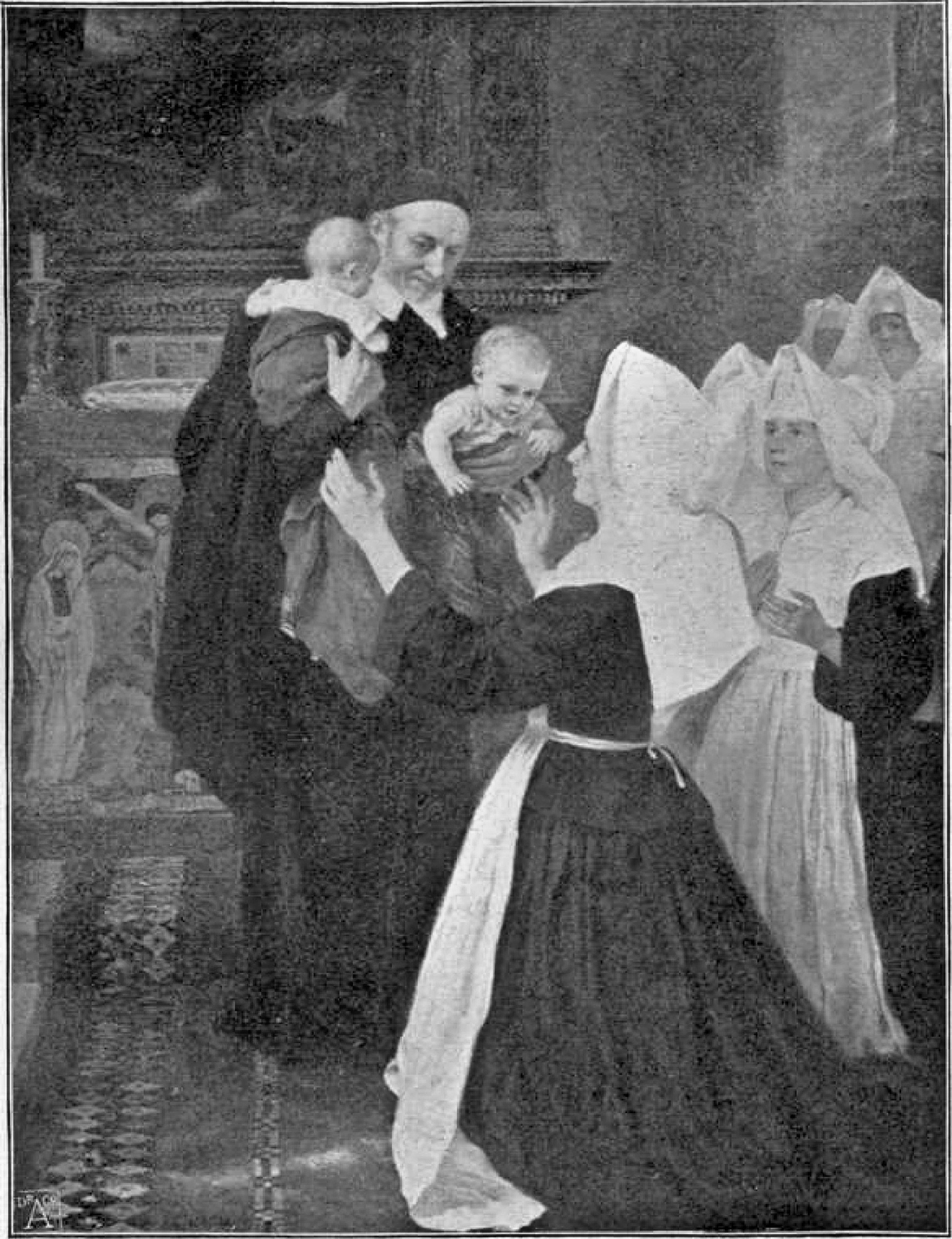
St. Vincent von Paul by Gabriel von Hackl

In 1633, Vincent de Paul, a French priest and Louise de Marillac, a widow, established the Company of the Daughters of Charity as a group of women dedicated to serving the "poorest of the poor". They set up soup kitchens, organized community hospitals, established schools and homes for orphaned children, offered job training, taught the young to read and write, and improved prison conditions.

Louise de Marillac and Vincent de Paul both died in 1660. By this time there were more than forty houses of the Daughters of Charity in France, and the sick poor were cared for in their own dwellings in twenty-six parishes in Paris. The 1789 French Revolution shut down all convents. The society was restored in 1801 and eventually spread to Austria, Australia, Hungary, Ireland, Israel, Portugal, Turkey, Britain and the Americas.

In 1809, the American Elizabeth Ann Seton founded the Sisters of Charity of St. Joseph, adapting the rule of the French Daughters of Charity for her Emmitsburg, Maryland, community.

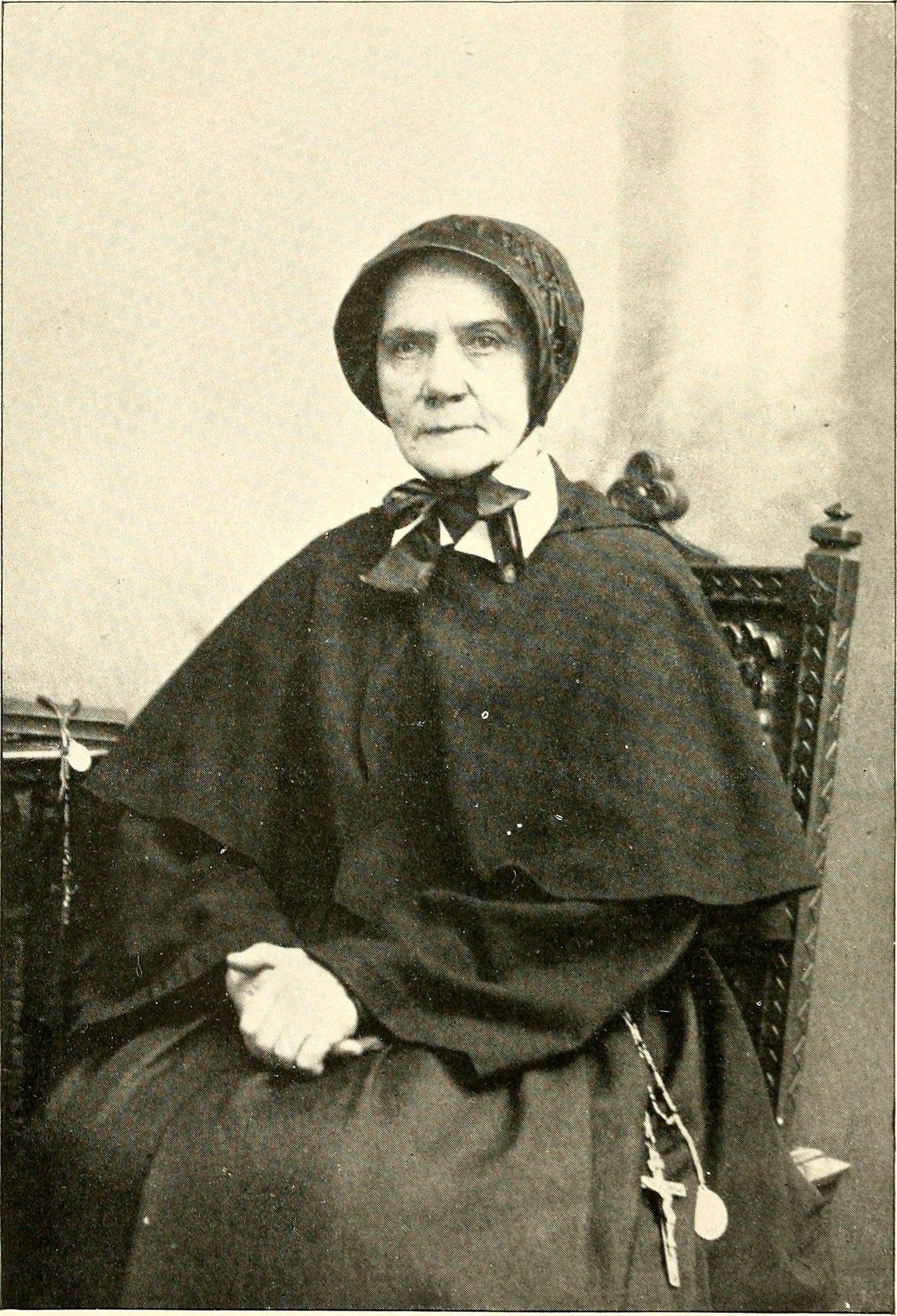
Sr. Anthony O'Connell (1897), US Civil War nurse

In 1817, Mother Seton sent three Sisters to New York City to establish an orphanage. In 1829, four Sisters of Charity from Emmitsburg, Maryland, traveled to Cincinnati, to open St. Peter’s Girl’s Orphan Asylum and School. In 1850, the Sulpician priests of Baltimore successfully negotiated that the Emmitsburg community be united with the international community based in Paris. The foundations in New York and Cincinnati decided to become independent diocesan congregations.

Six separate religious congregations trace their roots to the beginnings of the Sisters of Charity in Emmitsburg. In addition to the original community of Sisters at Emmitsburg (now part of the Vincentian order), they are based in New York City; Cincinnati, Ohio; Halifax, Nova Scotia; Convent Station, New Jersey; and Greensburg, Pennsylvania.

In 2011, the Daughters of Charity established The Province of St. Louise, bringing together the West Central, East Central, Southeast, and Northeast Provinces of the United States. Los Altos Hills in California remains a separate province.

=== List of affiliates ===
Sisters of Charity Federation in the Vincentian-Setonian Tradition:

- Daughters of Charity of Saint Vincent de Paul
  - Sisters of Charity of New York
    - Sisters of Charity of Saint Elizabeth (Convent Station, New Jersey)
    - Sisters of Charity of the Immaculate Conception (Saint John, New Brunswick, Canada)
      - Les Religieuses de Notre-Dame-du-Sacré-Cœur, (Dieppe, New Brunswick)
    - Sisters of Charity of Saint Vincent de Paul (Halifax) (Halifax, Nova Scotia, Canada)
      - Sisters of Saint Martha (Antigonish, Nova Scotia, Canada)
  - Sisters of Charity of Cincinnati
    - Sisters of Charity of Seton Hill (Pennsylvania)
  - Sisters of Charity of Nazareth (Kentucky)
    - Vincentian Sisters of Charity (Pittsburgh, Pennsylvania); (merged 2008)
  - Sisters of Charity of Leavenworth (Kansas)
  - Sisters of Charity of Our Lady of Mercy (South Carolina)

=== Paris, France ===
The most famous convent is at 140 Rue du Bac in Paris, France, Chapel of Our Lady of the Miraculous Medal, founded in 1633 by Vincent de Paul. This was where Catholics believe Sister Catherine Labouré later received the vision of Immaculate Mary on the eve of St. Vincent's feast day in 1830, as well as the dispensation of the Miraculous Medal.

== Other traditions ==
Many other groups called Sisters of Charity have also founded and operate educational institutions, hospitals and orphanages:

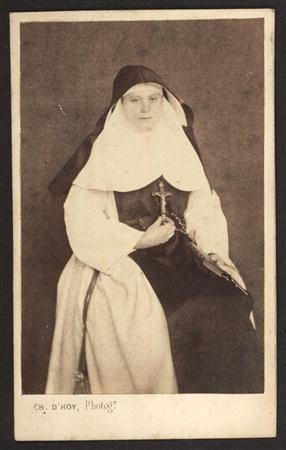
A Sister of Charity of Jesus and Mary, ca. 1900

- Sisters of Charity of Australia
- Sisters of Charity of the Blessed Virgin Mary
- Sisters of Charity of Jesus and Mary
- Sisters of Charity of Montreal (also known as Grey Nuns)
- Sisters of Charity of Nevers
- Sisters of Charity of Our Lady of Évron
- Sisters of Charity of St. Augustine
- Sisters of Charity of the Incarnate Word
- Sisters of Charity of Our Lady Mother of the Church
- Sisters of Charity of Saints Bartolomea Capitanio and Vincenza Gerosa (SCCG)
- Sisters of Charity of Our Lady Mother of Mercy (Netherlands)
- Sisters of Divine Charity
- St. Paul Sisters of Chartes, also known as the Sisters of Charity of St. Paul

=== Irish Sisters ===
The Religious Sisters of Charity, or Irish Sisters of Charity, founded by Mary Aikenhead in 1815, were one of the orders involved in the controversial Magdalene laundries.
