= Sisters of Charity of the Immaculate Conception =

The Sisters of Charity of the Immaculate Conception (SCIC) were established in 1854 by Honoria Conway and her companions in Saint John, New Brunswick. They serve in Canada, Peru, and Ireland.

== Thomas Connolly ==
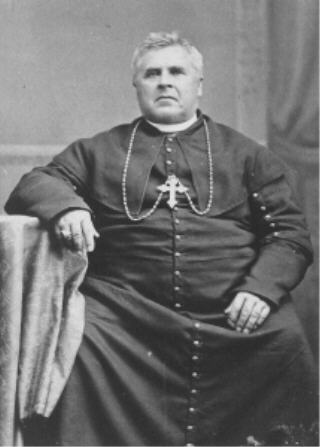
Bishop Thomas L. Connolly

Thomas-Louis Connolly was born in Cork in 1815. At the age of sixteen Thomas entered the Capuchin Novitiate, and at eighteen he was sent to Rome for intensive study and training. In 1838 he was ordained to the priesthood in the Cathedral of Lyon, France. He then returned to Ireland, where he worked as a prison chaplain in Dublin.

When Right Reverend William Walsh went to Halifax in 1842 as Coadjutor to Bishop William Fraser of Arichat, Nova Scotia, Father Connolly accompanied him as his secretary. Upon their arrival in Nova Scotia, the Bishop found ecclesiastical affairs in an unsettled state because of the discord between the Scots and the Irish. Bishop Walsh appointed Connolly administrator and in 1845 vicar general. During the years that Father Connolly held this position, he worked tirelessly among the poor, especially caring for the immigrants who arrived at the port. During an epidemic among these people, he contracted the disease and was seriously ill. Upon the death of Bishop Dollard, Connolly was consecrated on August 15, 1852.

== Honoria Conway ==
Honoria Conway (June 18, 1815 – May 27, 1892) was born while her father was garrisoned at Dover Castle in England. Her family was Welsh-Irish and she spent her early years at Ballinasloe, Ireland. Her parents were Michael and Eleanor McCarthy Conway. In 1837 she and her widowed mother immigrated to St. John to join her older sister and brother-in-law. They eventually settled with Mrs. Conway's brother in Meteghan, Nova Scotia.

Bishop Connolly had contacted the Sisters of Charity of St. Vincent de Paul in New York seeking sisters to staff a planned orphanage and Catholic schools in his diocese. He had sent Miss Conway to the novitiate in New York to prepare for the foundation of a local community. At age 37 she entered the novitiate at Mount St. Vincent, New York, taking the name Sister Mary Vincent.

== Sisters of Charity of St. John ==
In 1854 Bishop Connolly of Saint John again contacted the novitiate of the Sisters of Charity at Mount St. Vincent in New York, to appeal for help with a poor population that included many recent immigrants who had left Ireland in the "Great Migration" of the 1847 Great Famine. Many of them still felt the effects of the "ship's fever" typhus epidemic" from the crossing. Then in the summer of 1854, an epidemic of cholera broke out and 1,500 died, leaving many children orphaned.

Honoria Conway and three companions traveled from New York to New Brunswick and on October 21, 1854, Bishop Connolly accepted their vows as Sisters of Charity of Saint John, a new diocesan religious congregation. At the time of this move, it is possible that Honoria was still a novice; she had been in New York for just over a year. In accordance with custom of the times regarding diocesan religious, the bishop appointed the superior, choosing Honoria. Within a few years she began to serve as Novice Mistress as well. Despite her relative youth, it seems she was well suited by ability and temperament for fulfilling dual roles.

As their numbers increased, the sisters expanded their ministry to care of the aged and other health care apostolates. They opened five hospitals and missions in six other provinces of Canada. Visiting the sick remains an important ministry in Canada and Peru. As early as 1857, the Sisters were invited to establish the first of five convent-schools in New Brunswick's northern Acadian area.

The Sisters came to Saskatchewan in 1906, when three sisters arrived in Prince Albert to care for and teach the children at St. Patrick's Orphanage.

== Sisters of Charity of the Immaculate Conception ==
Up until 1914, the sisters operated as a diocesan community. In that year, they received papal approval and a new name. In 1924 fifty-three French-speaking Acadian sisters withdrew to form a new community in order to preserve their language and culture. This community became Les Religieuses de Notre-Dame-du-Sacré-Cœur, (Dieppe, New Brunswick), and concentrated their apostolate in the French-speaking areas of New Brunswick. Both orders are members of the Sisters of Charity Federation in the Vincentian-Setonian Tradition.

For more than a decade, the public has been welcomed to ecumenical Evening Prayer in the Saint John Region of New Brunswick.

The Sisters serve in Nova Scotia, New Brunswick, Saskatchewan, Alberta, British Columbia, and Peru. In the Archdiocese of Vancouver, their ministries include health care, pastoral care, and teaching including in the missions.

== See also ==
- Sisters of Charity
