= Sisters of Charity of Saint Vincent de Paul (Halifax) =

- Formation: May 11, 1849
- Type: Religious organization
- Legal status: active
- Purpose: advocate and public voice, educator and network
- Headquarters: Halifax Regional Municipality, Nova Scotia
- Region served: Canada, eastern United States, in Bermuda, Peru and the Dominican Republic.
- Official language: English; French
- Parent organization: Sisters of Charity Federation.
- Affiliations: Mount Saint Vincent University
- Website: Sisters of Charity of Saint Vincent de Paul

The Sisters of Charity of Saint Vincent de Paul were founded on May 11, 1849, when the four founding Sisters of Charity arrived in Halifax, Nova Scotia, from New York City; this has been designated a National Historic Event.

== Heritage ==
The Daughters of Charity of Saint Vincent de Paul, a Roman Catholic religious institute for women, was founded in France in 1633 by French cleric Vincent de Paul and the widow Louise de Marillac to serve the poor.

In 1809, Elizabeth Ann Seton, assisted by the French émigré community of Sulpicians, founded in Emmitsburg, Maryland, the Sisters of Charity of St. Joseph's, named after Saint Joseph's Academy and Free School, which she had established. They adopted for their habit a black dress, cape, and bonnet, patterned after the widows weeds of women in Italy whom Elizabeth had encountered there.

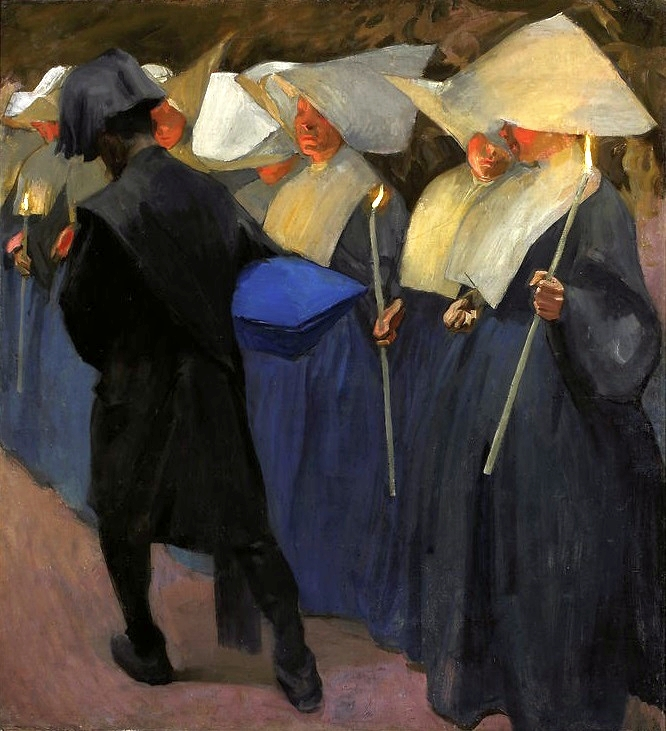
Painting of Daughters of Charity by Karol Tichy.

In 1810 Bishop Benedict Joseph Flaget was able to obtain from France a copy of the rules of the Daughters of Charity of St. Vincent de Paul. The rule, with some modifications, was approved by Archbishop Carroll in January 1812, and adopted. In 1817, Sisters were sent to New York City (Seton's hometown) to establish an orphanage. After some year of negotiation, in 1850, the community at Emmitsburg formally affiliated with the Mother House of the Daughters of Charity in Paris and at that time adopted the blue habit and the white collar and cornette, becoming the first American province of the Daughters of Charity.

The congregation's superiors in France directed that sisters in charge of boys' orphan asylums were everywhere to be withdrawn. This brought them into conflict with Bishop John Hughes, whose sister Ellen (Sister Angela) was a member of the New York Community. Unwilling to abandon their charges, in 1846, the Sisters in New York separated from the motherhouse in Emmitsburg, and were incorporated as the Sisters of Charity of New York. Of the forty-five sisters then in the diocese, ten returned to Emmitsburg. The New York sisters retained their black habit. (During the cholera epidemic of 1849, Mother Angela Hughes opened St. Vincent's Hospital in Manhattan.)

== History ==
The story of the Canadian foundation begins when four American ladies, black-robed, black-capped, landed in Halifax from the Cunard liner "Cambria" on May 11, 1849. They came from New York City, these first Sisters of Charity, in response to a standing request by Bishop William Walsh of Halifax to his friend Archbishop John Hughes of New York for Sisters to work in his diocese in the care of orphans and in education. Halifax had a population of 20,000 when the four "American ladies" arrived. The Bishop gave them a house on Barrington Street, near the cathedral, where they took in a little orphan girl on the very first day. They immediately opened a school to teach Catholic children, many of them Irish immigrants, victims of the Great Famine. By the end of the school year (July) their classes held 400 children. By that time the Sisters were also caring for twenty little girls in their own house.

They would be the first religious community in this maritime city. Mother Basilia McCann, leader of the original four Sisters who arrived here in 1849, became the first Superior of the Halifax Congregation. Mother Basilia was a pupil of Elizabeth Seton, founder of the first Sisters of Charity in 1809. She served as Superior for three years, then returned to the New York community. The second Superior to serve in Halifax was Sister Mary Rose McAleer, also one of the original group to come to Halifax in 1849.

Shortly after their arrival the Sisters opened their first school, housed at St. Mary's Convent in the heart of the city. Halifax was still a growing city, and with no hospital yet established, the need for assistance spanned beyond education. The Sisters responded to this need. Within a short time they were also caring for the sick.

By 1856, the order in Halifax was accepted as a separate congregation by Pope Pius IX and took on their new official name, the "Sisters of Charity of St. Vincent de Paul, Halifax." Sister Mary Rose McAleer and two novices began teaching girls in St. Patrick's Parish in the North end of the city. At first they traveled daily to teach in the church basement. A house was soon rented for them, and thus began St. Patrick's Convent – and High School and Elementary School. St. Patrick's was the first of more than a hundred missions that would eventually be opened by the Sisters of Charity. When St Patrick’s moved to larger quarters in 1888, the former convent was converted into a refuge for unmarried mothers and their babies, named the Home of the Guardian Angel.

In 1866 victims of cholera were landed from an immigrant ship on McNab's Island in the harbour and when the Archbishop asked for helpers, all the Sisters volunteered. He chose three. That summer the increase in the number of orphans led to expansion of facilities. By September 1873, the Sisters moved into the newly built Motherhouse named Mount Saint Vincent, just outside Halifax.

Sisters from the order first came to Boston, Massachusetts, in August 1887, called to staff a new school for girls at St. Patrick’s Parish in Roxbury.

In 1873, the order founded Mount St. Vincent Academy in Halifax, Nova Scotia. Mount Saint Vincent received its college charter in 1925. It became Mount Saint Vincent University in 1966. A long tradition ended in 2006 when Sister Sheilagh Martin, a biology professor, retired as the last member of the congregation to teach there.

On April 30, 1880, Leo XIII issued a document removing from the Archbishop of Halifax "any jurisdiction" he had held over the Sisters of Charity, and placing the Congregation under the Pope's immediate control.

In 1900, the Sisters of Saint Martha developed as a separate, sister congregation.

They came to British Columbia in 1923, founding Seton Academy, Vancouver (1923), Our Lady of Perpetual Help Convent, Ladysmith (1923); St. Joseph's Convent, Vancouver (1924); Our Lady of Sorrows Convent, Vancouver (1926); Our Lady's Convent, Point Grey (1927); Kootenay Indian Residential School, Cranbrook (1936); Immaculate Conception Convent, Kelowna (1938); Sacred Heart Convent, Kimberley (1938).

From its opening in 1929 to its closing in 1967, the Sisters of Charity operated the Shubenacadie Indian Residential School, the grounds of which were designated by Parks Canada a national historic site based on its history of widespread sexual, physical and psychological abuse of indigenous children. In 2021 the Sisters of Charity posted an apology on their website, but refused to answer questions about the school or allow access to their archives.

== Charism ==
The charism of the Sisters of Charity of Halifax is rooted in the tradition of Saints Elizabeth Ann Seton, Vincent de Paul, and Louise de Marillac.

== Ministry ==
The areas of education, health care, pastoral ministry, and social services are still paramount, though the ways in which the sisters work within a given field has changed. While the congregation once operated hospitals, schools, senior citizen homes, and the only women's university in Canada, sisters now serve in a variety of areas in Canada and throughout the eastern United States, in Bermuda, Peru, and the Dominican Republic.

In 1975, at the beatification of Saint Elizabeth Ann Seton, there were approximately 1700 sisters in the organization and 97 missions. Today, there are approximately 260 sisters.

The headquarters of the religious institute is located in Halifax's Rockingham neighbourhood at the Sisters of Charity Centre. The original Motherhouse building, which also incorporated Mount Saint Vincent Academy and College (the precursors to the current University) was built around the time of the Academy's founding in 1873 and destroyed by fire in 1951. Rebuilt separately in the late 1950s, it housed retired sisters of the order as well as visiting religious and laypeople. It also housed for Mount Saint Vincent University a student residence called Vincent Hall until the residence was closed by the University in 1992. The building, once the largest in all of Atlantic Canada, was demolished in 2008. In 2011 the property was sold to developer Southwest Properties, Ltd. The first phase of the development includes residential and retail components. The development is to be known as Seton Ridge.

The order is part of the Sisters of Charity Federation. Two growing interests for the order are ecological projects and helping victims of human trafficking, issues they are working on with the Leadership Conference of Women Religious.

== See also ==
- Catholic sisters and nuns in Canada
- Sisters of Charity
- Sisters of Saint Martha
