= Sisters of Charity of Seton Hill =

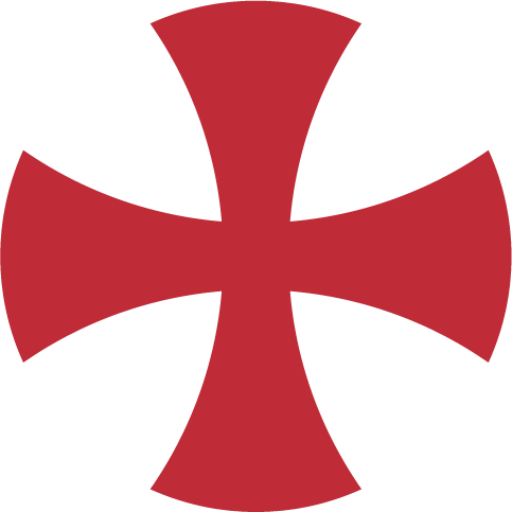
Icon of the Sisters of Charity

The Sisters of Charity of Seton Hill were founded by Sister Aloysia Lowe. In 1870, she and sisters Blanche O'Keefe, Maria Theresa O'Donnell, Maria Kavanaugh and two novices were sent to western Pennsylvania from the Sisters of Charity of Cincinnati and began their work, founding and staffing schools. The sisters later expanded their work to include healthcare.

== History ==
In 1809, Elizabeth Ann Seton established a religious order of women in Emmitsburg, Maryland, based on the rule drawn up by Vincent de Paul for Louise de Marillac's Daughters of Charity. The community expanded as it received requests from bishops in New York, St. Louis, Missouri; Cincinnati, Ohio and elsewhere to send sisters to staff schools, orphanages, and hospitals. When the Emmitsburg community decided to affiliate with the French Daughters of Charity, the Cincinnati sisters decided in 1852 to become an independent congregation.

In 1869, Bishop Michael Domenec of Pittsburgh appealed to the Cincinnati community of Sisters of Charity for sisters to serve the needs of the growing Catholic population in his diocese. Although the Cincinnati Sisters were unable to take on a new mission, they did agree to prepare novices to then return to Pittsburgh with experienced sisters of the Cincinnati congregation who would stay to establish the new community. Sister Aloysia Lowe, three other Sisters of Charity, and two novices, left Cincinnati and arrived in Altoona, Pennsylvania, on August 20, 1870.

=== Education ===
Under the direction of Mother Aloysia Lowe and her assistant, Sister Anne Regina Ennis, the Altoona convent became an independent foundation of the Sisters of Charity. In quick succession, schools were opened in Blairsville, Johnstown, and the Pittsburgh neighborhoods of East Liberty, Sharpsburg, Lawrenceville, and South Side.

In the summer of 1882, recognizing the need for a larger motherhouse, Mother Aloysia for her growing Congregation and purchased the Jennings Farm in Greensburg where Seton Hill University's main hilltop campus now stands. She named the site, which consisted primarily of farmland, Seton Hill, in honor of Elizabeth Ann Bayley Seton, the founder of the Sisters of Charity and the first American-born saint. The property had fallen into neglect over the years but a few usable buildings remained, including the Stokes mansion. Named for previous owner William Axton Stokes, a wealthy lawyer and a major in the Civil War, this grand home had once contained the first private library Andrew Carnegie had ever seen, inspiring the public libraries he established in later years. The mansion still stands on Seton Hill University's campus and was renamed St. Mary Hall.

There, they also established a school for boys and in 1883, St. Joseph's Academy for Girls. Within the next year, Saint Joseph Academy was opened. After creating the Saint Joseph Academy for Girls (which operated until 1947), the Sisters of Charity of Seton Hill founded what came to be known as the Seton Hill Schools (which included the Seton Hill Conservatory of Music and Seton Hill Conservatory of Art) in 1885. In 1914, the Sisters opened the doors to Seton Hill Junior College. Four years later, in 1918, the Commonwealth of Pennsylvania approved Seton Hill's charter for a four-year institution of higher learning and Seton Hill College was born. A charter of incorporation was granted to the Sisters of Charity of Seton Hill in 1885, and the sisters broke ground for a motherhouse the following year. It was completed in 1889. Seton Hill's physical campus includes the original 200 hilltop acres in addition to a downtown cultural district campus and a nearby Center for Orthodontics.

=== Healthcare ===
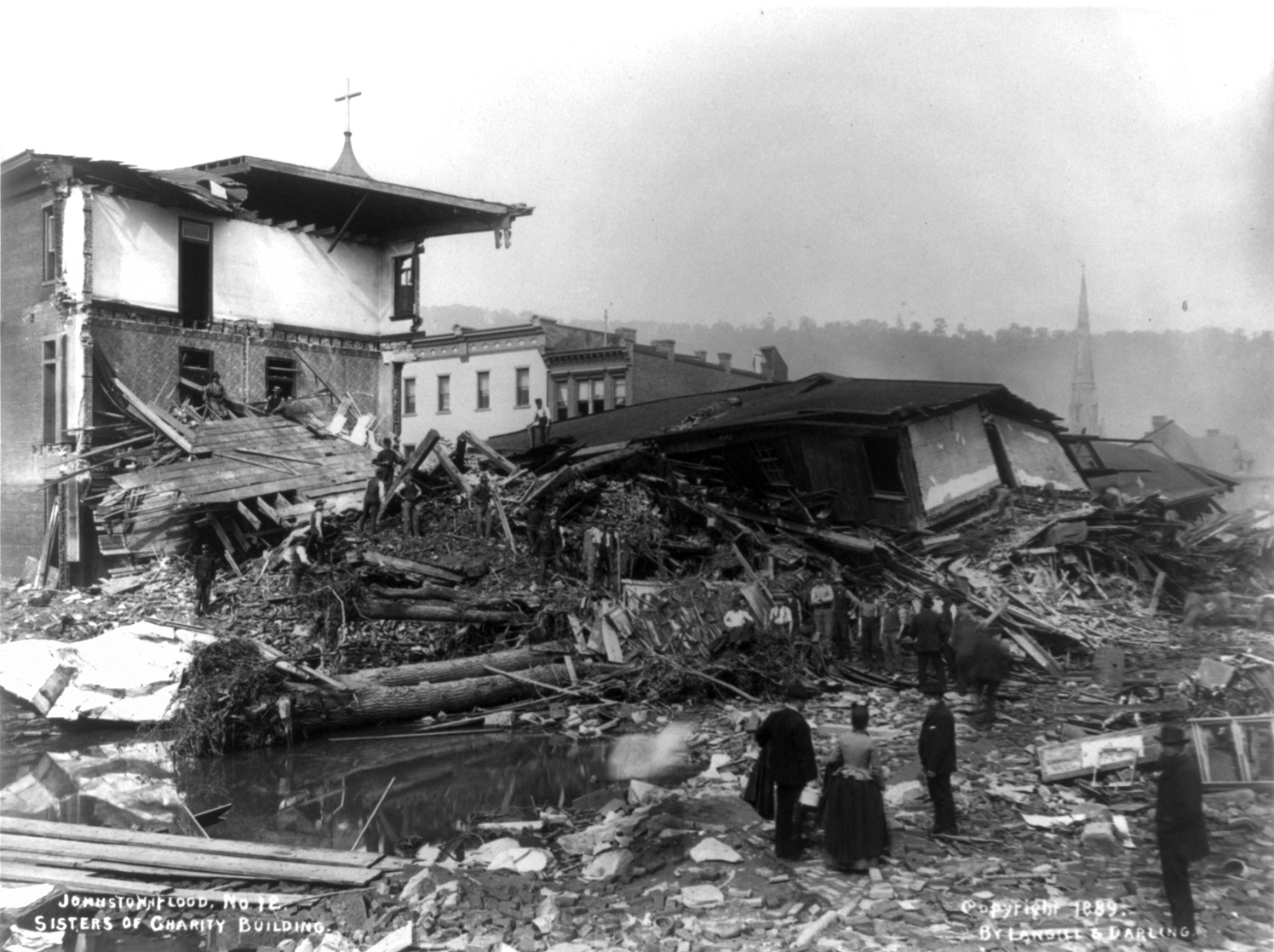
The Sisters' home was destroyed in the Johnstown Flood

In 1889, the Sisters at Saint John's Convent in Johnstown, who lost their own home in the Johnstown Flood, stayed in the stricken city to provide healthcare to other flood victims. This was the first recorded instance of healthcare ministry by the Sisters in hospitals, as eleven of their number served at the Prospect Hospital, and in the temporary hospital established by the Pennsylvania Railroad.

Charity Hospital (later Pittsburgh Hospital) opened in 1897. In 1905 the Sisters established the Pittsburgh Hospital School of Nursing.

Twenty years after their foundation in the Diocese of Pittsburgh, the Seton Hill Sisters of Charity, with diocesan approval, partnered with Mrs. Charles Donnelly, wife of a prominent businessman, to initiate a foundling home. On July 16, 1891, the Sisters of Charity took possession of a small house at 3935 Forbes Street. Within a month, eighteen infants arrived and the sisters realized more space was required. They procured, with the assistance of Mr. Donnelly, the old Ursuline Academy building at the corner of Cliff and Manilla Streets in the Hill District. Named Roselia in memory of Mrs. (Roselia Rafferty) Donnelly, the institution soon opened a maternity ward for shelter and prenatal care. A fully accredited school of practical nursing opened at Roselia in 1910 to educate women in maternal and child care until its closure in 1953. A new four-story Roselia building, located at 1635 Bedford Avenue, was dedicated on September 9, 1956. From 1891 to 1971 the Sisters of Charity and their partners at Roselia Foundling welcomed women in need.

== Ministry ==
From Seton Hill, Sisters moved out into the region, then into Arizona, California, Maryland, Louisiana, Ohio, and West Virginia. They established The Roselia Foundling Asylum and Maternity Hospital and Pittsburgh Hospital, and staffed Jeannette District Memorial Hospital and Providence Hospital of Beaver Falls.

Founded in 1908 by the Catholic Diocese of Pittsburgh and the Sisters of Charity of Seton Hill, DePaul School for Hearing and Speech has been providing auditory/oral education for children with hearing loss for nearly 100 years. The school was originally known as the Pittsburgh School for the Deaf (and then as DePaul Institute) and was located in the Lappe Mansion on the North Side of Pittsburgh. Because of the school's growing population, the Pittsburgh Diocese purchased property in Mt. Lebanon and built a new facility for educational and residential programs in 1911. The DePaul School for Hearing and Speech programs grew and prospered on that site until the summer of 2002, when DePaul moved to its new location in the Shadyside area of Pittsburgh.

In 1941, the Sisters purchased the former West Liberty Public School property in the Brookline section of Pittsburgh and opened the Elizabeth Seton High School to offer education to young women in Allegheny County. When the high school merged with South Hills Catholic High School to form Seton-LaSalle, the sisters established the Seton Center. Seton Center hosts a Senior Center and Adult Day Services facility, a School of Arts, and an after-school program for children from kindergarten to age 12.

The Sisters of Charity became a Pontifical Congregation in 1948 and made perpetual vows for the first time the following year.

In 1960, the Congregation sent Sisters to Mokpo, Korea, to establish the community's first foreign mission. As of 2019, there were 346 sisters serving in schools, hospitals, parishes, social service agencies, and other apostolates in the United States, South Korea, and Ecuador.

The administrative offices and motherhouse of the Congregation moved from the original campus to facilities one mile away, on land adjacent to that of Seton Hill University.

== See also ==
- Sisters of Charity Federation in the Vincentian-Setonian Tradition
- Sisters of Charity (disambiguation)
