= National Shrine of St. Elizabeth Ann Seton =

Roman Catholic shrine in Maryland, United States

Coordinates: 39°41′52″N 77°19′52″W

National Shrine of Saint Elizabeth Ann Seton
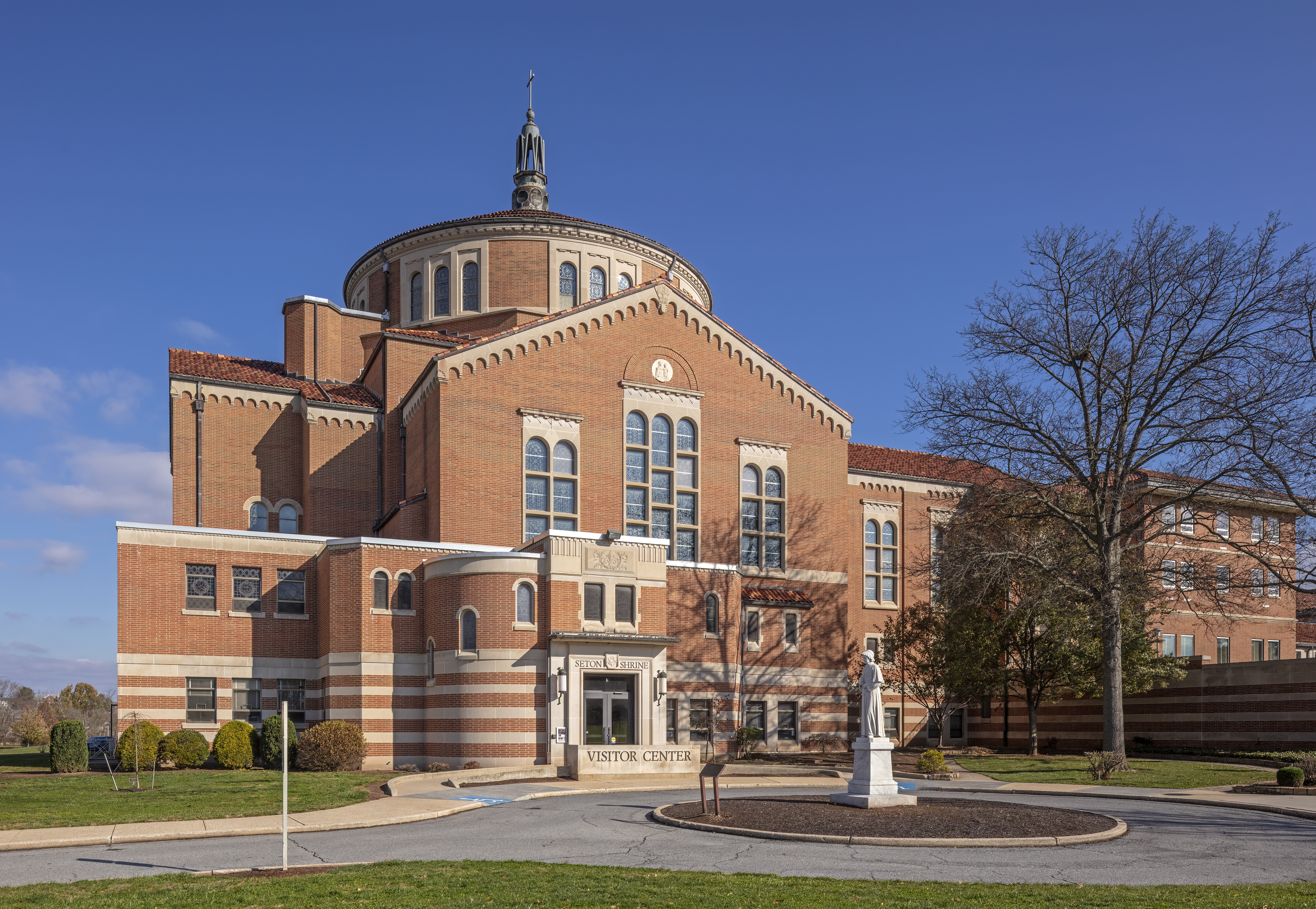
- The shrine and basilica

Religion
- Affiliation: Roman Catholic
- Diocese: Archdiocese of Baltimore
- Ecclesiastical or organisational status: Minor basilica

Location
- Location: 339 South Seton Ave; Emmitsburg, Maryland, United States
- Interactive map of National Shrine of Saint Elizabeth Ann Seton

Architecture
- Completed: 1965

Website
- www.setonshrine.org

The National Shrine of Saint Elizabeth Ann Seton is a U.S. religious site and educational center in Emmitsburg, Maryland, that pays tribute to the life and mission of Elizabeth Ann Seton (August 28, 1774 – January 4, 1821), the first native-born citizen of the United States to be canonized by the Roman Catholic Church. It is both a minor basilica and a national shrine.

== History ==
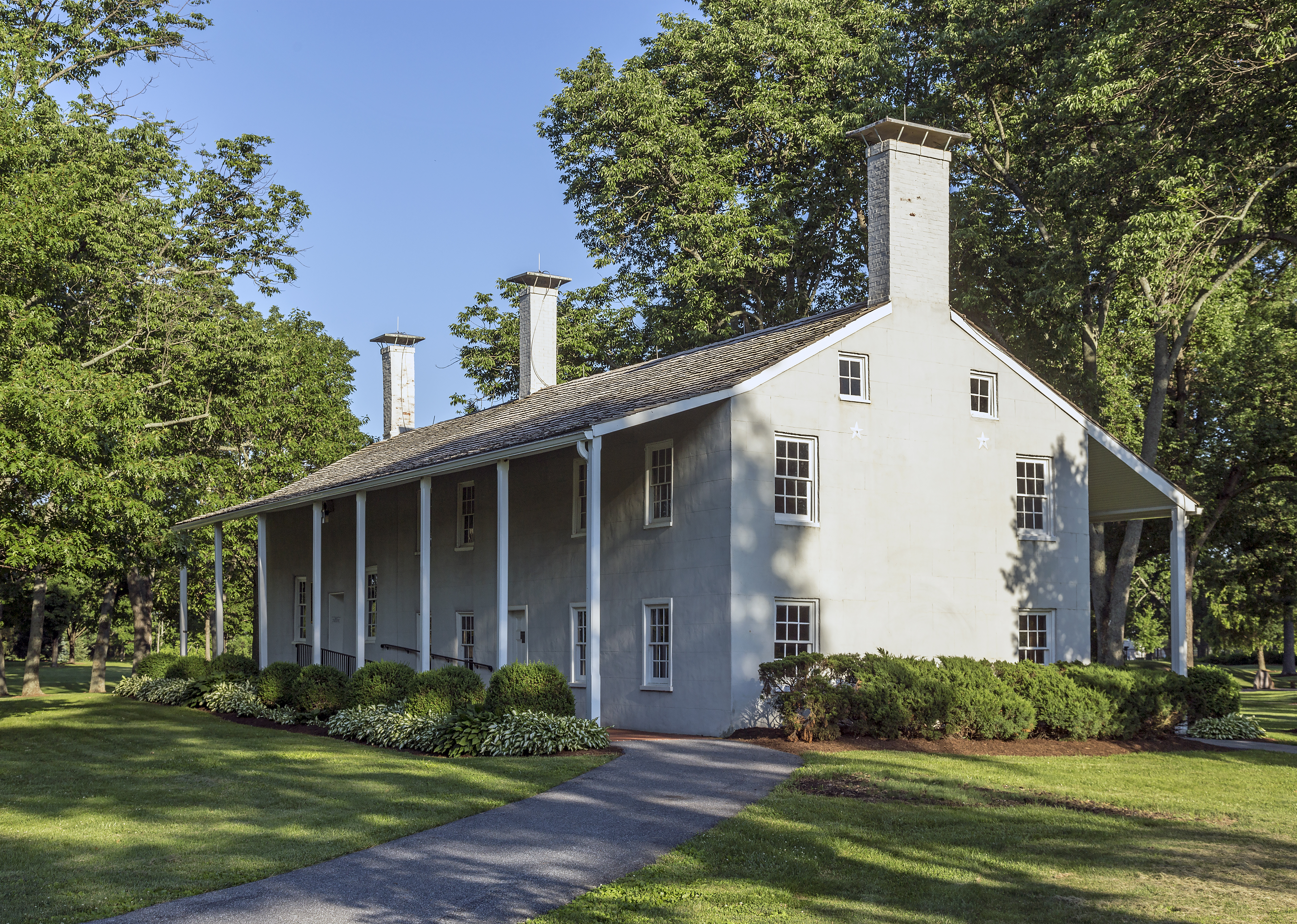
The Stone House

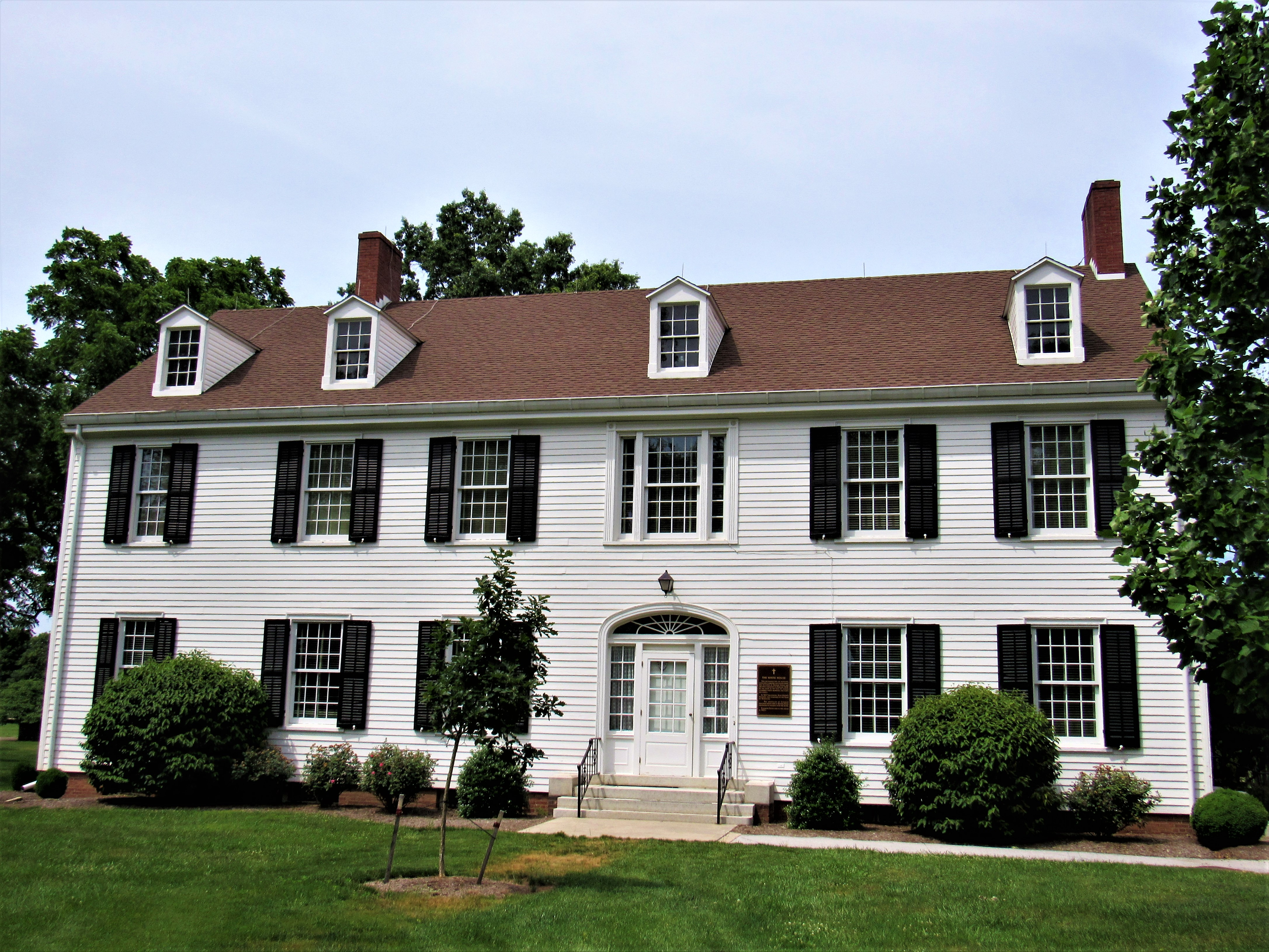
The White House

Born of a prominent Anglican family in New York City, Elizabeth Ann Bayley Seton was received into the Roman Catholic faith at Saint Peter's Church, Barclay Street in lower Manhattan, March 14, 1805. At the invitation of the Rev. Louis William Dubourg, S.S., Elizabeth came to Maryland in 1808 and opened a school next to the chapel of St. Mary's Seminary in Baltimore. Samuel Sutherland Cooper, a wealthy convert and seminarian, bought 269 acres of land for an establishment for the sisterhood near Emmitsburg in the countryside of Frederick County, Maryland. According to tradition, Elizabeth named the area Saint Joseph's Valley. In June 1809 she established the Sisters of Charity of St. Joseph.

The former Fleming farmhouse, informally called the "Stone House", built in 1750 near Toms' Creek, served as the first headquarters of the community. In the first winter there, the wind blew in icy drafts through the chinks of the building, and the occupants sometimes awoke to find a blanket of snow had drifted into the rooms during the night.

In mid-October 1809, Archbishop John Carroll of Baltimore, who had come to administer Confirmation to the children, determined that the building was unsuitable, and directed the erection of a new log structure, now called the "White House." In mid-February 1810, Elizabeth and her companions moved into the recently completed Saint Joseph's House (the White House). There she established the first free Catholic school for girls in the United States, which was the beginning of the Catholic parochial school system in the United States. After her death in early January 1821, Mother Seton was buried in Emmitsburg, at the cemetery that she once dubbed "God's Little Acre".

Saint Joseph's Chapel was consecrated on May 6, 1841. King Louis-Phillippe and Queen Marie-Amelie of France gave three paintings for the new chapel, one of them the "Assumption", after the original by Murillo. Because of the extension of the cloister towards the chapel, the "White House" was moved from its original location to a spot northwest of the chapel. In 1846, at the request of William Seton, his mother's body was removed to a mortuary chapel, which had been built in the Sisters' cemetery.

During the Civil War, at least 270 sisters served as nurses and were called "angels of the battlefield" by both Union and Confederate soldiers. The Sisters also served as nurses during the Spanish–American War.

== The shrine complex ==
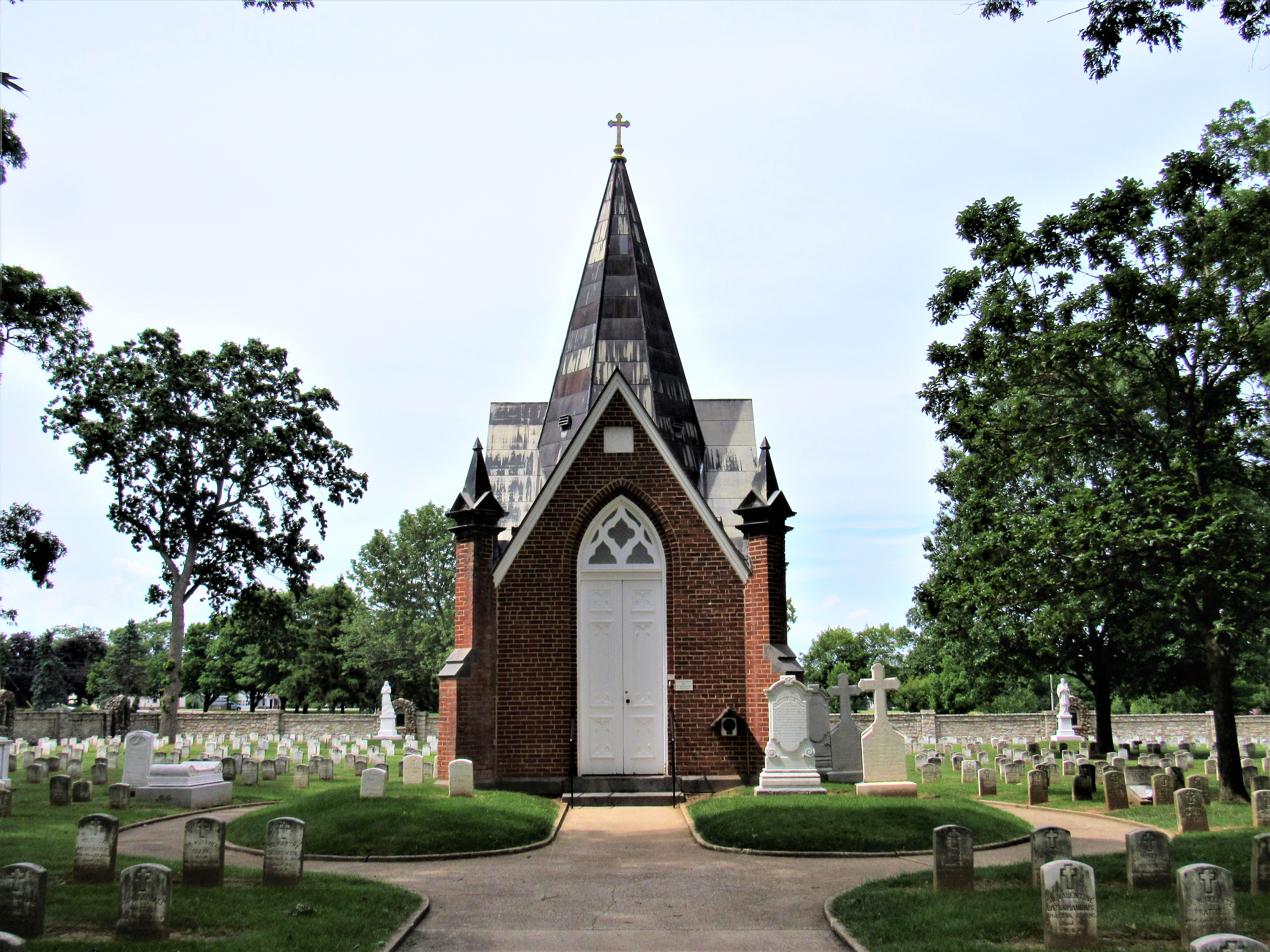
St. Joseph Cemetery

The Stone House, the White House, and the cemetery have been incorporated into the grounds of the shrine, which also includes a basilica, a museum, the Mortuary Chapel where Mother Seton's remains were once entombed, and a visitors center. The shrine is part of the Archdiocese of Baltimore and is a pilgrimage destination for many Roman Catholics.

The shrine's basilica was dedicated in 1965. The interior contains many works of art created by craftsmen and artisans in Italy and Germany. Mother Seton was canonized in 1975 and her remains were moved from the "God’s Little Acre" cemetery to the basilica. In 1991, the shrine's chapel was designated as a minor basilica by Pope John Paul II. The formal designatation ceremony took place on August 4, 1991, under the guidance of Archbishop Agostino Cacciavilan, the Apostolic Pro-Nuncio to the United States.

The shrine hosts an annual event in celebration of Mother Seton, honoring all girls and women named "Elizabeth" and "Elizabeth Ann." Those bearing that name take part in a special procession during Mass where they enter the basilica together carrying a banner, and two women in the procession are chosen to venerate Mother Seton by carrying flower vases to the saint's tomb.

== Patroness for the Sea Services ==
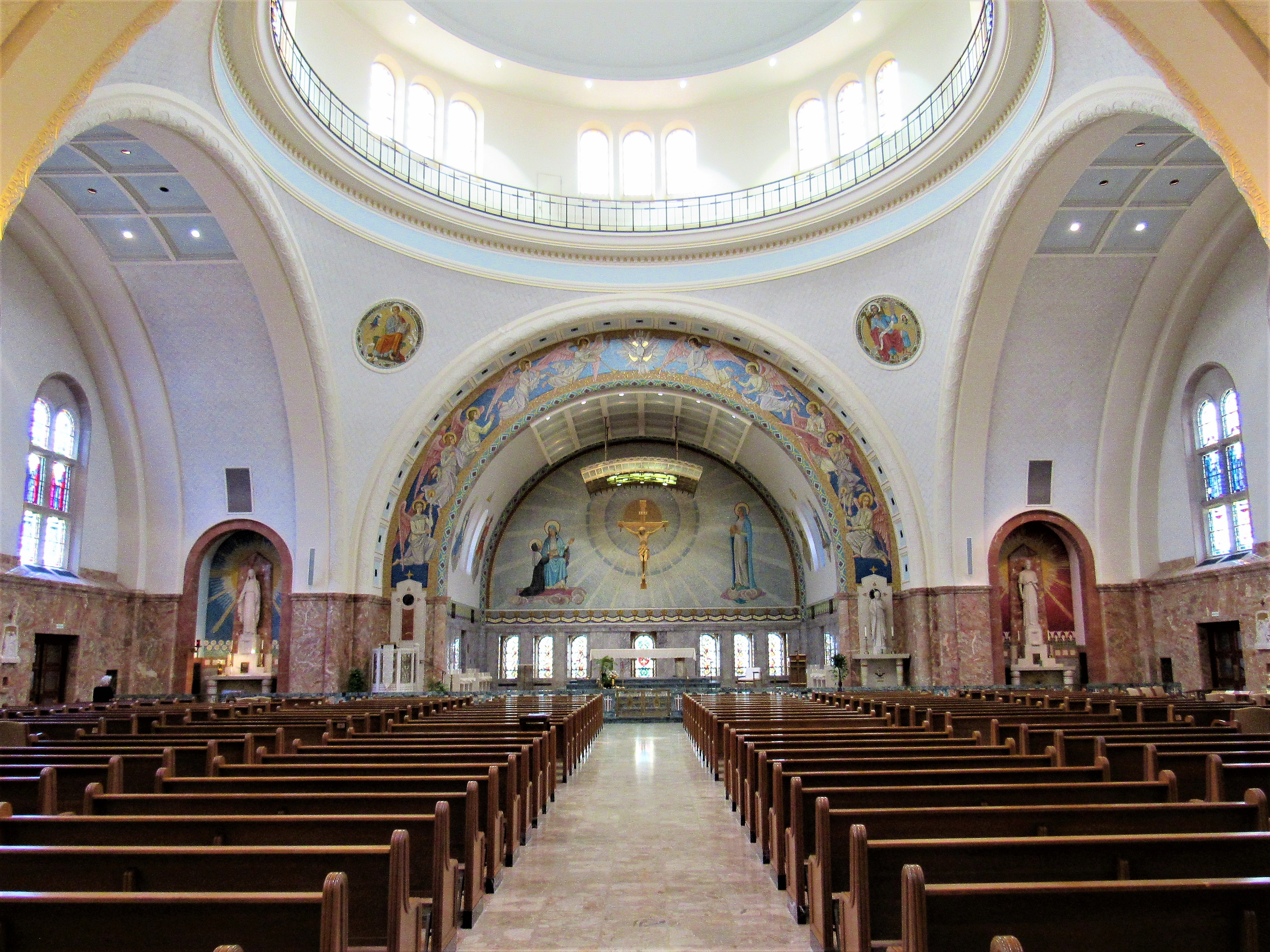
Basilica interior

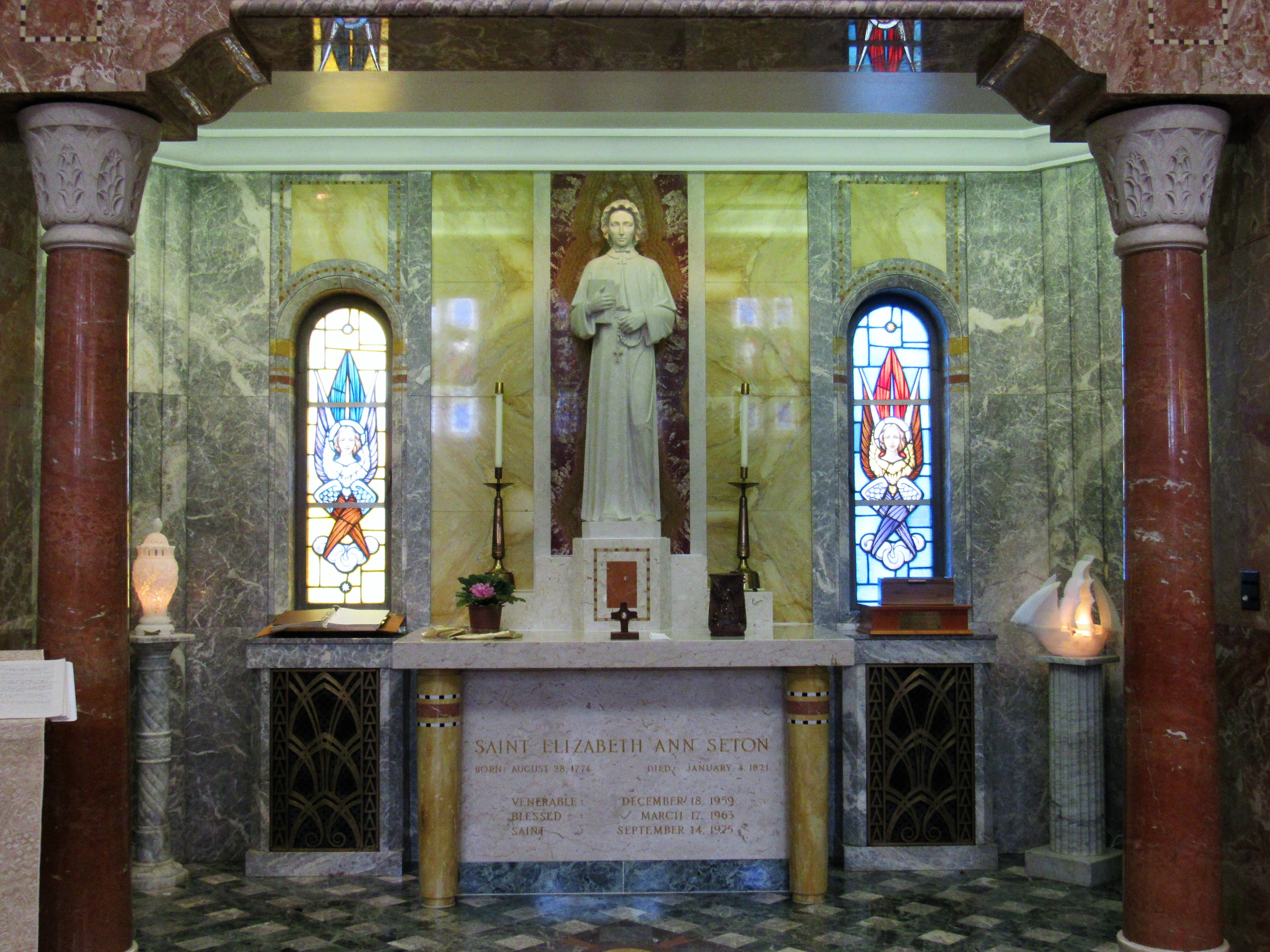
Mother Seton's tomb inside the basilica.

Saint Elizabeth Ann Seton is Patroness for the Sea Services due to her deep concern for her sons, William and Richard, both of whom served in the U.S. Navy, as evidenced by her many letters to them during their years at sea. The National Shrine hosts an annual Pilgrimage for the Sea Services. Members of the Navy, Marine Corps, Coast Guard, Merchant Marine, and The United States Public Health Service along with family members and friends gather at the basilica in Emmitsburg. The event is held on the first Sunday in October each year to honor the Patroness for the Sea Services and ask for her intercession for all the men and women serving in the nation's Sea Services. Seton Heritage Ministries coordinates the annual event and spreads devotion to the saint under this title.

== See also ==
- Sisters of Charity Federation in the Vincentian-Setonian Tradition
- Shrine of St. Elizabeth Ann Bayley Seton, Manhattan, New York City
- Top eight Catholic pilgrimage destinations in the US
