= Sisters of Charity Federation in the Vincentian-Setonian Tradition =

The Sisters of Charity Federation in the Vincentian-Setonian Tradition is an organization of fourteen congregations of religious women in the Catholic Church who trace their lineage to Saint Elizabeth Seton, Saint Vincent de Paul, and Saint Louise de Marillac.

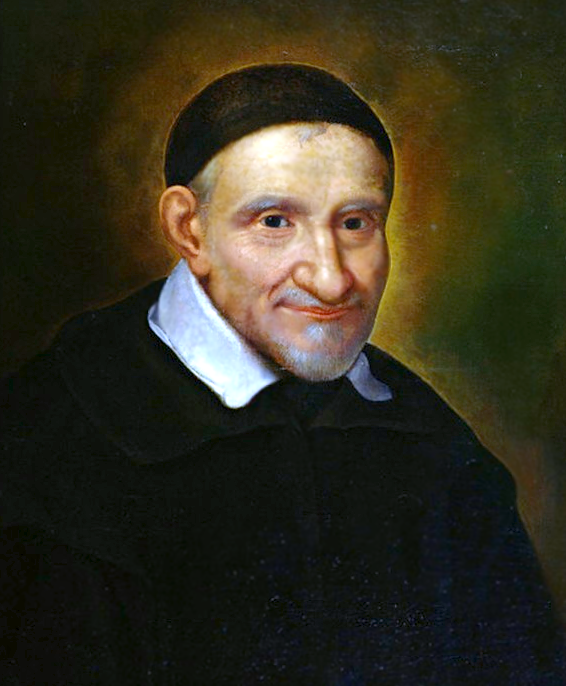
Vincent de Paul

== Members ==
The Sisters of Charity Federation in the Vincentian-Setonian Tradition represents approximately 4,000 vowed members and 700 lay associates/affiliates from women religious congregations throughout North America. The purpose of the Federation is to facilitate collaboration in projects related to ministry and other areas of common concern.

The federation of Sisters of Charity includes:

- Daughters of Charity of Saint Vincent de Paul (France; two provinces in U.S.: the Province of St. Louise, headquartered in St. Louis, Missouri, and the Province of the West, headquartered in Los Altos, California.)
- Sisters of Charity of New York (New York City)
- Sisters of Charity of St. Elizabeth (Convent Station, New Jersey)
- Sisters of Charity of the Immaculate Conception (Saint John, New Brunswick, Canada)
- Les Religieuses de Notre-Dame-du-Sacré-Cœur, (Dieppe, New Brunswick)
- Sisters of Charity of Saint Vincent de Paul (Halifax) – Halifax (Halifax, Nova Scotia, Canada), also known as the Sisters of Charity of Halifax
- Sisters of Saint Martha (Antigonish, Nova Scotia, Canada)
- Sisters of Charity of Cincinnati
- Sisters of Charity of Seton Hill (Pennsylvania)
- Sisters of Charity of Nazareth (Kentucky)
- Vincentian Sisters of Charity (VSC) (Pittsburgh, Pennsylvania) – one of the original Federation members, in November 2008, the congregation merged with the Sisters of Charity of Nazareth (SCN).
- Sisters of Charity of Leavenworth (Kansas)
- Sisters of Charity of Our Lady of Mercy (South Carolina)
- Sisters of Saint Martha of Prince Edward Island

== History ==
=== Origins ===
==== France ====
The Company of the Daughters of Charity, founded in France on November 29, 1633, developed from the parish-based Confraternities of Charity, and became the first successful institute of non-cloistered religious women to serve in the active apostolate in France.

==== United States ====
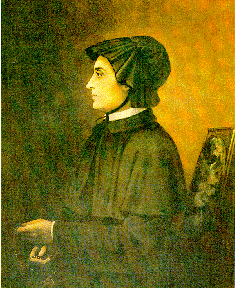
Saint Elizabeth Ann Seton (1774–1821) was the foundress of the Sisters of Charity.

The foundress of the American branch of the Sisters of Charity was born Elizabeth Ann Bayley, the daughter of Dr. Richard and Catherine Charlton Bayley, who are members of a prominent family of New York City. Elizabeth was raised in the Episcopal faith. After the death of her mother in 1777, her father married Charlotte Amelia Barclay. Their son, Guy Charleton Bayley, was the father of James Roosevelt Bayley, who converted to Roman Catholicism and later became Archbishop of Baltimore.

On January 25, 1794, Elizabeth Ann Bayley married William Magee Seton in St. Paul's Church, New York. They had five children. Seton was in the import-export business. In 1803, Mr. Seton's health deteriorated and, anticipating a better climate, he, Elizabeth, and their oldest daughter Anna Maria sailed for Leghorn, Italy, leaving the other children in care of Seton's sister, Rebecca. William Seton succumbed to tuberculosis on December 27, 1803. Elizabeth and Anna Maria were accommodated by the families of her late husband's Italian business partners, the Filicchis. While staying with them, she was introduced to Roman Catholicism. Some months later she sailed for home, arriving on June 3, 1804.

In March 1805, Elizabeth Bayley Seton was received into the Catholic Church by Father Matthew O'Brien in St. Peter's Church, Barclay Street, New York. For a time she attempted to support herself by opening a school for boys, but the widely circulated report that this was a proselytizing scheme forced the school to close. Her sons had been sent by the Filicchis to Georgetown College. She hoped to find a refuge in some convent in Canada, where her teaching would support her three daughters.

Reverend Louis William Dubourg, S.S., met Elizabeth Bayley Seton about 1806 in New York and invited her to Baltimore to establish a small boarding school for girls near the Sulpician institution, Saint Mary’s College & Seminary. After a long delay, she and her daughters reached Baltimore in 1808, and she opened a school next to the chapel of St. Mary's Seminary. A school for poor children was subsequently opened in nearby Emmitsburg. Elizabeth's sisters-in-law Cecilia and Harriet Seton joined her. As a preliminary to the formation of a new community, Mrs. Seton took vows privately before Archbishop Carroll and her daughter Anna. In 1810, Bishop Flaget was commissioned by the community to obtain from France the rules of the Sisters of Charity of St. Vincent de Paul. The rule, with some modifications, was approved by Archbishop Carroll in January 1812, and adopted. Mrs. Seton was elected superior. Others joined the community and on July 19, 1813, Mother Seton and eighteen sisters made their vows. Mother Seton died at Emmitsburg, Maryland, on January 4, 1821.

===== Expansion =====
In 1814, the sisters were given charge of an orphan asylum in Philadelphia; in 1817 they were sent to New York. In the 1840s, the Emmitsburg motherhouse made plans to become affiliated with the French community. Archbishop Hughes of New York suggested that the New York community separate from Emmitsburg and become a diocesan community, which it did in 1846. Communities in Newark and Halifax (1856) grew out of New York.

In 1850, the original Emmitsburg adopted the rule and habit with cornette of the Paris house. The winged appearance of the cornette would bring the sisters the affectionate nickname "God's geese" as they flew around a hospital in their prominent wimples.

The sisters in Cincinnati separated to form a diocesan community (1852). The Sisters of Charity continued to develop into independent new congregations in Convent Station (1859) and Greensburg (1870).

=== Federation ===
The Federation developed from the "Conference of Mother Seton's Daughters" was founded in 1947 in part to advocate Seton's canonization, but has since expanded its role. The Conference remained loosely organized until 1965. The Decree on the Adaptation and Renewal of Religious Life, Perfectae Caritatis, proclaimed on October 25, 1965, by Pope Paul VI stated that: "Independent institutes and monasteries should, when opportune and the Holy See permits, form federations if they can be considered as belonging to the same religious family." In 1997, the Federation gained recognition as a Non-Governmental Organization (NGO) at the United Nations, where it serves as an advocate for the sisters' concern for the poor at the Economic and Social Council of the United Nations.

At the 2004, annual meeting in New York, the Federation voted to continue to make water a focus for advocacy, while integrating it into their efforts to address structures that keep people poor around the world. Access to water, particularly in developing countries, was seen as an important key to reducing poverty.

== See also ==
- National Shrine of St. Elizabeth Ann Seton
