= Alexandre-Marie Guillemin =

French painter (1817–1880)

Portrait of Guillemin, by Étienne Carjat

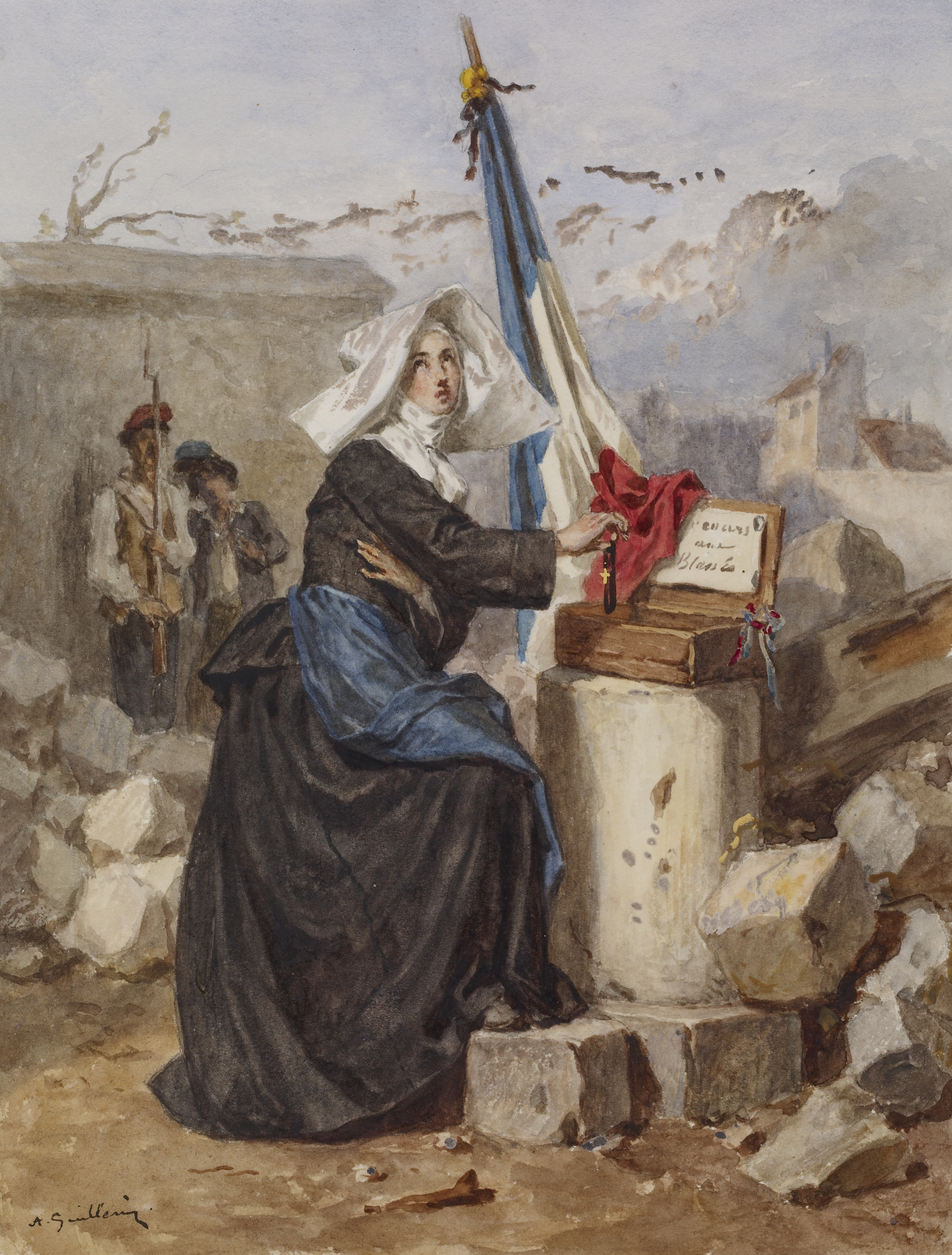
Aid for the Wounded (Sister of Charity) by Alexandre-Marie Guillemin, c. 1865, watercolor, 24.1 × 18.3 cm. Walters Art Museum

Alexandre-Marie Guillemin (1817 – 1880) was a French genre painter. He studied under Antoine-Jean Gros and in 1861 he was awarded the Legion of Honour.
