= Elizabeth Ann Seton =

American Roman Catholic educator and saint (1774–1821)

Saint Elizabeth Ann Seton SC
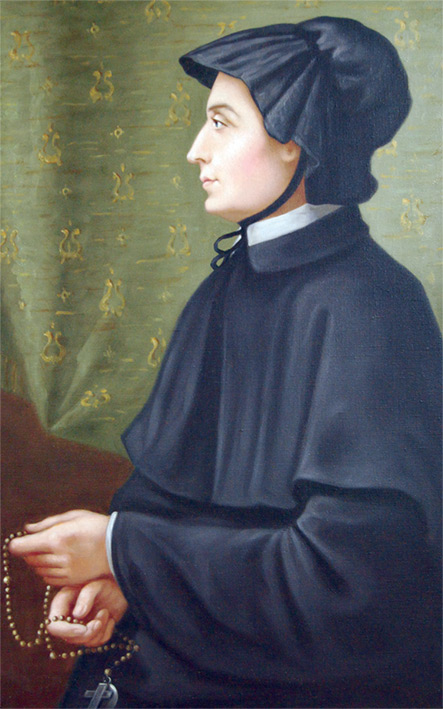

Widow, Religious, Foundress, Educator
- Born: Elizabeth Ann Bayley; August 28, 1774; New York City, Province of New York, British America
- Died: January 4, 1821 (aged 46); Emmitsburg
- Venerated in: Catholic Church, Episcopal Church (United States)
- Beatified: March 17, 1963, by Pope John XXIII
- Canonized: September 14, 1975, by Pope Paul VI
- Major shrine: National Shrine of St. Elizabeth Ann Seton, Emmitsburg, site of her tomb Shrine of St. Elizabeth Ann Bayley Seton, New York City, site of her former residence
- Feast: January 4th
- Patronage: Catholic schools; widows; Shreveport, Louisiana; the State of Maryland; and Catholic converts

Elizabeth Ann Bayley Seton SC (August 28, 1774 – January 4, 1821) was an American Catholic educator, known as a founder of the country's parochial school system. Born in New York and reared as an Episcopalian, she married and had five children with her husband William Seton. She converted to Catholicism in 1805 and established the first Catholic girls' school in the nation in Emmitsburg, Maryland. There she also founded the first American congregation of religious sisters, the Sisters of Charity.

On September 14, 1975, Seton was the first person born in what would become the United States to be canonized by the Catholic Church.

== Biography ==
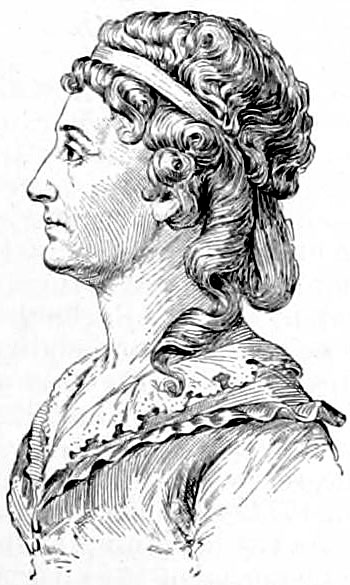
Elizabeth Ann Seton, from Appleton's Cyclopaedia

=== Early life ===
Elizabeth Ann Bayley was born on August 28, 1774, the second child of Richard Bayley and Catherine Charlton of New York City. Both parents belonged to wealthy Protestant families that were among the earliest European settlers in the New York area.

Richard's parents were of French Huguenot and English descent and lived in New Rochelle, New York. Numerous Huguenots had emigrated to North America in the late 17th and early 18th centuries due to religious persecution in France. A surgeon, Richard served as the chief health officer for the Port of New York. His job entailed examining immigrants disembarking from ships at Staten Island. He also helped care for the sick during yellow fever outbreaks in the city. Richard later served as the first professor of anatomy at Columbia College in Manhattan.

Catherine was the daughter of a Church of England priest who served as rector at St. Andrew's Church on Staten Island. Elizabeth was raised as an Episcopalian.

When Elizabeth was three-years-old in 1777, her mother Catherine died. The cause may have been complications from the birth of Elizabeth's sister, Catherine. The infant died early the following year. Richard later married Charlotte Amelia Barclay from another prominent New York Family. She participated in her church's social ministry and often took young Elizabeth with her to distribute food and needed items to the poor in their homes. Richard and Charlotte had five more children. Richard provided Elizabeth with her education; she was a prolific reader who read the Bible.

After Richard and Charlotte divorced, she refused to take Elizabeth and her older sister. When Richard traveled to London for further medical studies, the two sisters moved in with their paternal uncle, William Bayley, and his wife, Sarah (Pell) Bayley. During this period, Elizabeth mourned her rejection by Charlotte, as she later reflected in her journals. During one bout of depression, Elizabeth considered committing suicide by overdosing on laudanum. She later credited God for ending those thoughts.

Elizabeth's journals showed her love for nature, poetry, and music, especially the piano. Other entries expressed her religious aspirations and favorite passages from her reading, showing her introspection and natural bent toward contemplation. Elizabeth was fluent in French and English, could play the piano, and was an accomplished horse rider.

=== Marriage and motherhood ===
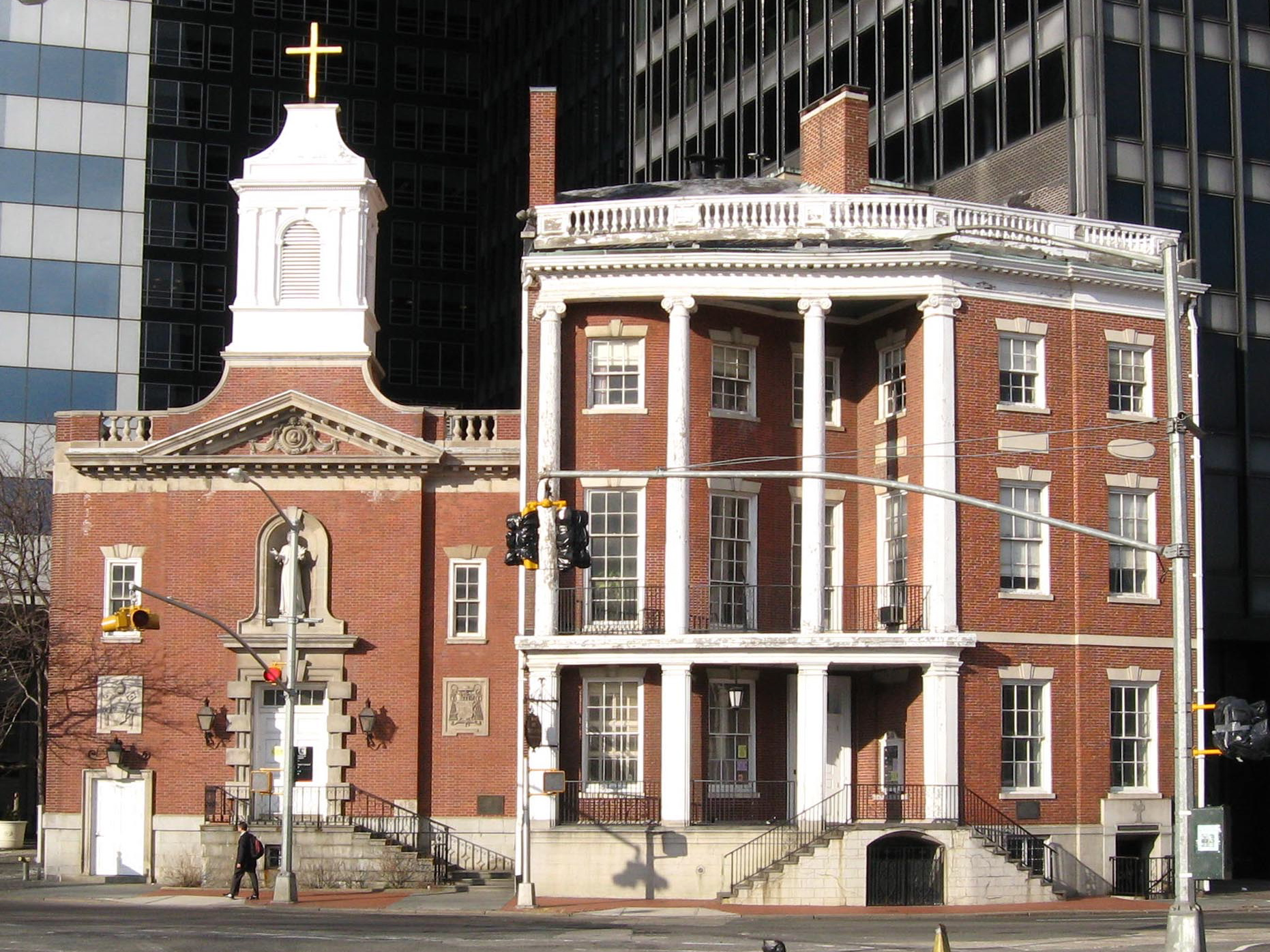
Site of the former Seton home in Lower Manhattan, now occupied by a church

On January 25, 1794, at age 19, Elizabeth married William Magee Seton, aged 25, a wealthy businessman in the import trade. Samuel Provoost, the first Episcopal bishop of New York, presided at their wedding. Elizabeth's father-in-law, the elder William Seton, came from an impoverished aristocratic Scottish family. He had emigrated to New York City in 1758; he later became superintendent and part-owner of the iron-works of Ringwood, New Jersey. A loyalist to the British crown during the American Revolution, the elder William served as the last royal public notary for New York City and the Province of New York.

The elder William started an import-export mercantile firm, the William Seton Company, where his two sons worked. It became Seton, Maitland, and Company in 1793. The younger William toured the important counting houses on a business trip to Europe in 1788. During that trip, he brought the first Stradivarius violin back to the United States.

Shortly after their marriage, Elizabeth and William Seton moved into an upscale residence on Wall Street in Manhattan. The Setons worshipped at Trinity Episcopal Church in Lower Manhattan. A devout communicant, Elizabeth took the pastor John Henry Hobart as her spiritual director. Along with her sister-in-law, Rebecca Mary Seton, Elizabeth continued Charlotte's social ministry. The two women nursed the sick and dying among family, friend, and needy neighbors. Elizabeth became a charter member of The Society for the Relief of Poor Widows with Small Children in 1797 and served as its treasurer.

=== Financial setbacks ===
When the elder William Seton died in 1798, his son William took over the firm. The couple already had their own five children: Anna Maria (Annina) (1795–1812), William II (1796–1868), Richard Seton (1798–1823), Catherine (1800–1891) and Rebecca Mary (1802–1816). The couple took in William's six younger siblings, ages seventeen to seven. The much expanded family required that they move to his father's residence in Lower Manhattan. In 1807, the US Congress passed the Embargo Act of 1807 that prohibited trade with foreign nations. The law sent the American economy into a financial depression and severely damaged the finances of Seton, Maitland, and Company. After losing several ships to seizure from Great Britain and France, William was forced declare bankruptcy. He sold his father's house in Lower Manhattan and the family moved to the house of Elizabeth's father Richard on Staten Island. During this time of financial stress, Seton became more committed to her religious faith.

=== Death of William Seton ===
Throughout most of their married life, William Seton suffered from tuberculosis. By 1803 his condition, exacerbated by the stress of his financial situation, had worsened. William's doctors recommending spending time in a warmer climate to recover. William sailed to Tuscany in late 1803, accompanied by Elizabeth and Anna Maria, their eldest daughter. The younger children stayed in New York with Rebecca Seton.

However, on landing in Livorno, the authorities held the Seton family in quarantine for a month. This was due to fears that they might be carrying yellow fever. William died in Livorno on December 27, 1803. He was buried in the Old English Cemetery in that city. Released from quarantine, Elizabeth and her daughter Anna Maria were made guests by William's Italian business partners, Filippo and Antonio Filicchi. During their stay with the Filicchis, Elizabeth was introduced to Catholicism.

=== Conversion to Catholicism ===
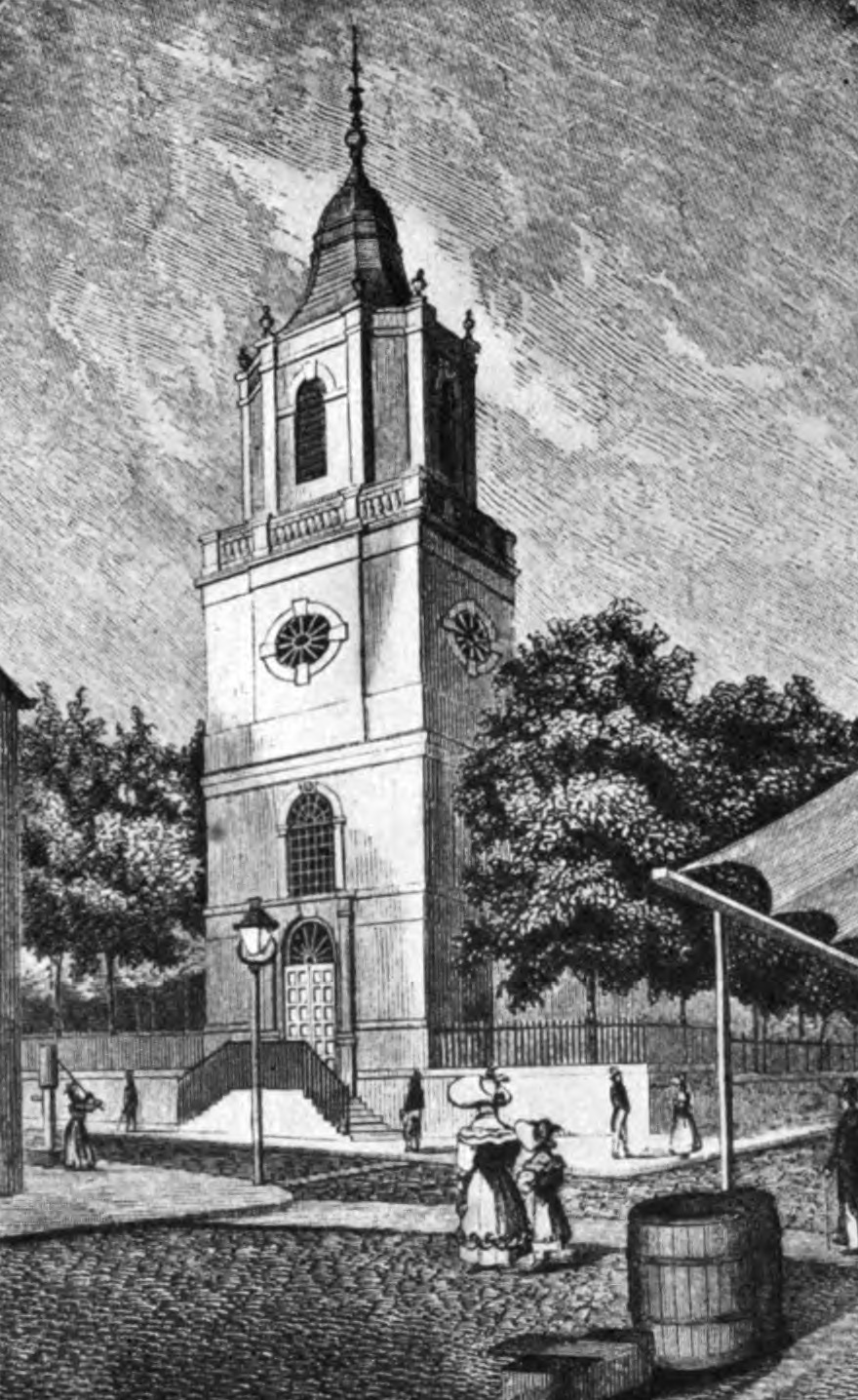
St. Peter's Church, Manhattan (1785)

In June 1804, Elizabeth Seton and her daughter Anna Maria returned to New York. To support her family, Seton started an academy for girls. This was a common practice for upper class widows of that period.

After approximated eight months of reflection and correspondence with the priest Jean-Louis Lefebvre de Cheverus in Boston, Seton decided to become a Catholic. She was received into the Catholic Church on March 14, 1805, by Matthew O'Brien, pastor of St. Peter's Church in Manhattan, the only Catholic church in the city. At that time, Catholics represented a small minority in New York City; many of the city's residents mistrusted them. When the Protestant parents of her students learned about Seton's conversion, they pulled them out of the academy. Seton's family also ostracized her due to the conversion.

Seton received her confirmation in 1806 from Bishop John Carroll of the Archdiocese of Baltimore, the only archdiocese in the United States at the time. In 1807, Seton opened a boarding house in the Bowery section of Lower Manhattan for students attending a local Protestant academy.

Discouraged by the hostility in New York City towards Catholics, Seton considered moving to the British Province of Lower Canada, which was majority Catholic. However, her plans changed after meeting a visiting priest, Louis William Valentine Dubourg. He was a member of Sulpician Fathers, a religious order forced to leave France after the French Revolution of 1789 to 1799. Dubourg was serving as president of St. Mary's College in Baltimore. The Sulpicians were establishing the first Catholic seminary in the United States in Emmitsburg, Maryland. Dubourg invited Seton to open a school for girls there.

=== Founder ===
In early 1809, Seton accepted the Sulpicians' invitation and moved with her children and several followers to Emmitsburg, Maryland. She received financial support from Samuel Sutherland Cooper, a wealthy seminarian at the new Mount Saint Mary's University. On July 31, 1809, Seton established the Sisters of Charity of St. Joseph’s, a religious community in Emmitsburg dedicated to the care of poor children. Seton became known as "Mother Seton". This was the first congregation of religious sisters founded in the United States.

Seton then opened in 1809 the Saint Joseph's Academy and Free School in Emmitsburg, a school dedicated to the education of girls. It was the first free Catholic school in the country. Seton wrote classroom textbooks and trained her sisters to become teachers. She accepted all students, regardless of their ability to pay. In 1811, the sisters adopted the rules of the Daughters of Charity. Seton and several of her colleagues in 1813 took vows of poverty, chastity, obedience, and service to the poor.

=== Later life and death ===
In 1815, Seton sent three sisters to manage the St. John’s Orphan Asylum in Philadelphia, Pennsylvania. When her 17-year-old daughter Anna Marie was dying in 1815, Seton wrote the hymn "Jerusalem". The hymn was first published before 1820 and was thereafter published in several hymnals in which the tune name is "Jerusalem". Seton was possibly the first American-born woman to have an original hymn tune published and also the first to have a widely sung hymn text (stanzas 2-4) published. Her daughter Rebecca died the next year. Seton established a mission in 1817 in New York City.

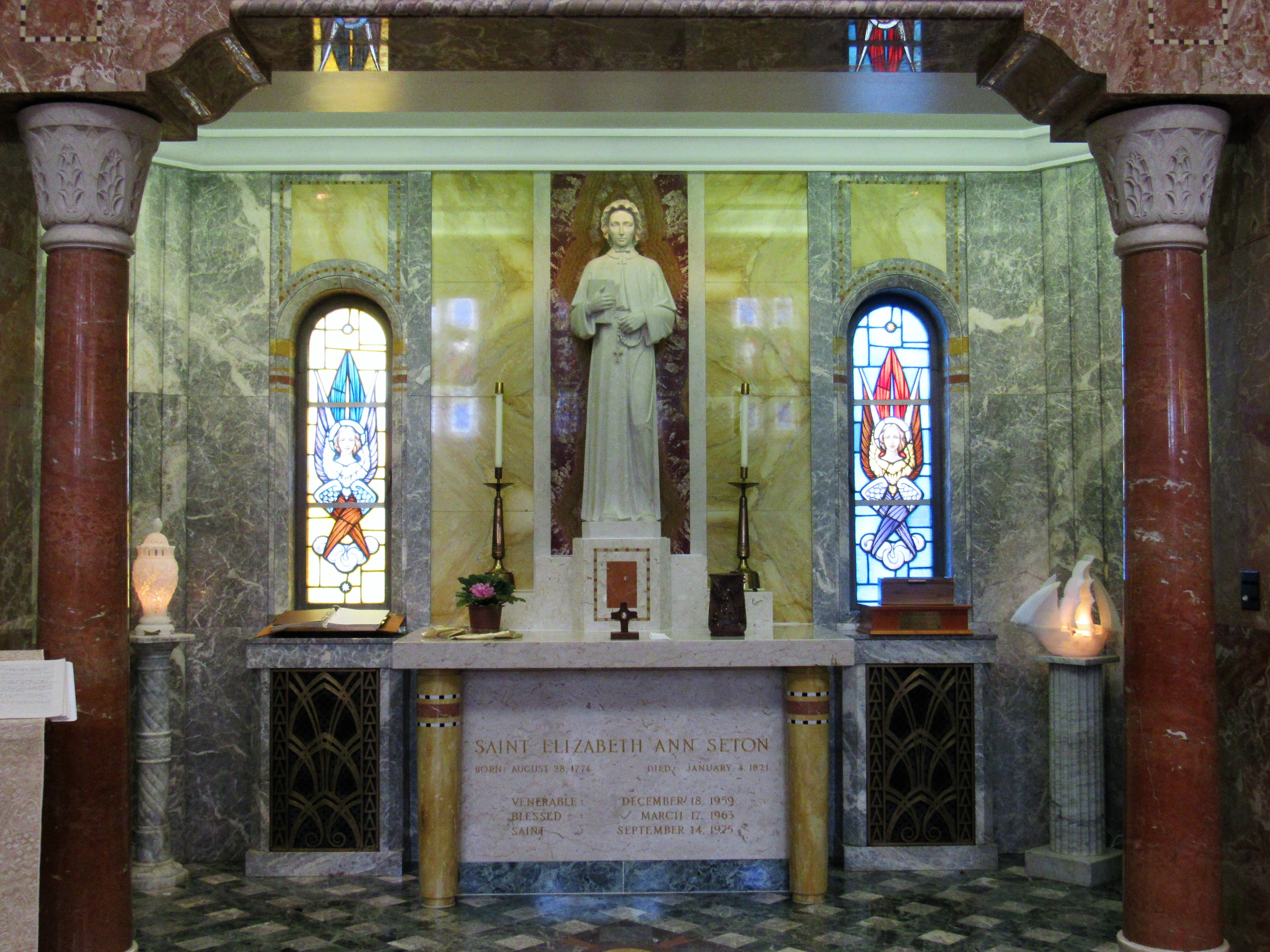
The Seton tomb in Emmitsburg, Maryland

In her later years, Seton suffered from tuberculosis. She spent the rest of her active life supervising St. Joseph's Academy. She died in Emmitsburg on January 4, 1821, at age 46. Her remains are interred at the National Shrine of Saint Elizabeth Ann Seton in Emmitsburg.

== Legacy ==
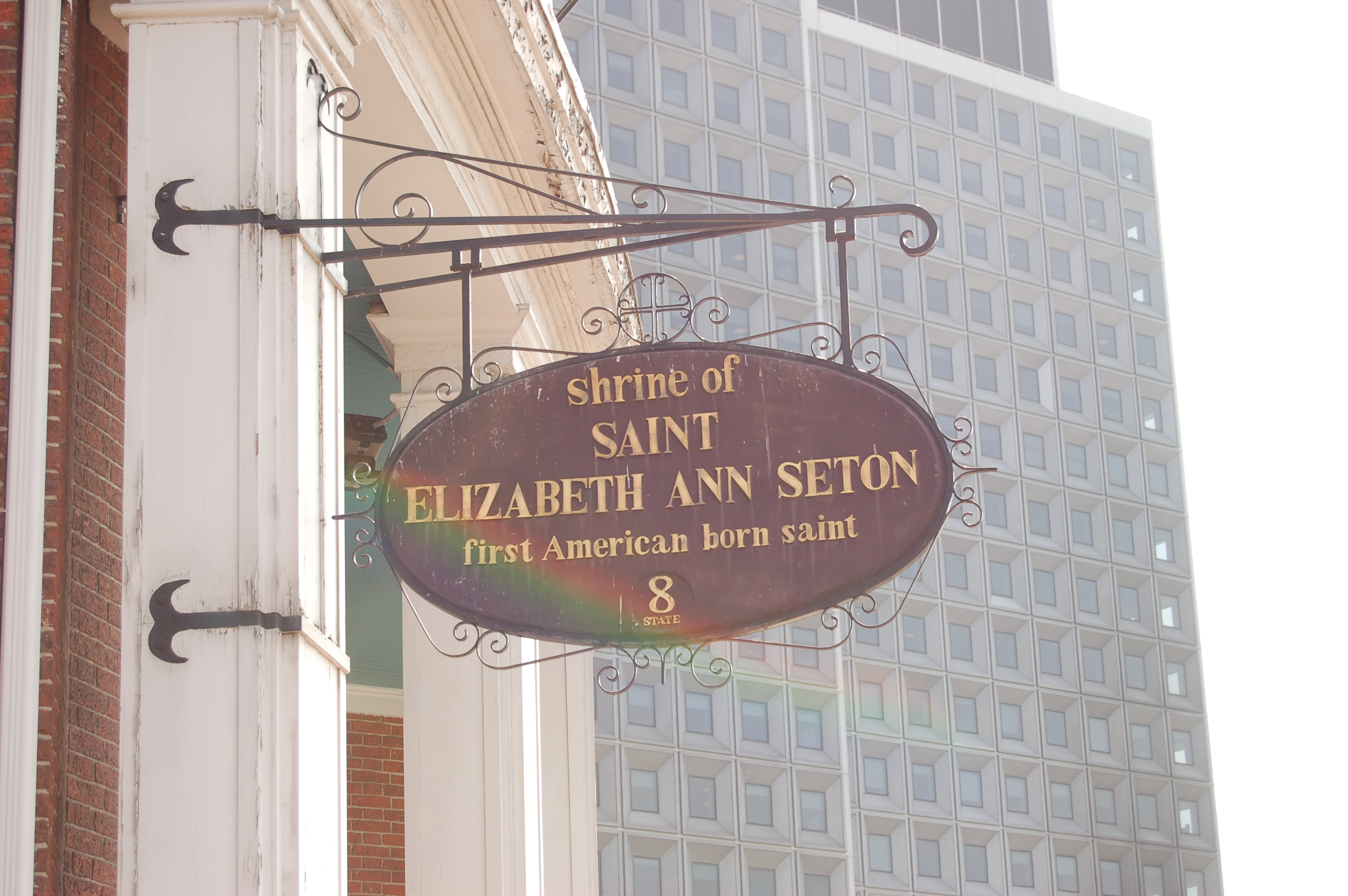
Sign of the New York shrine

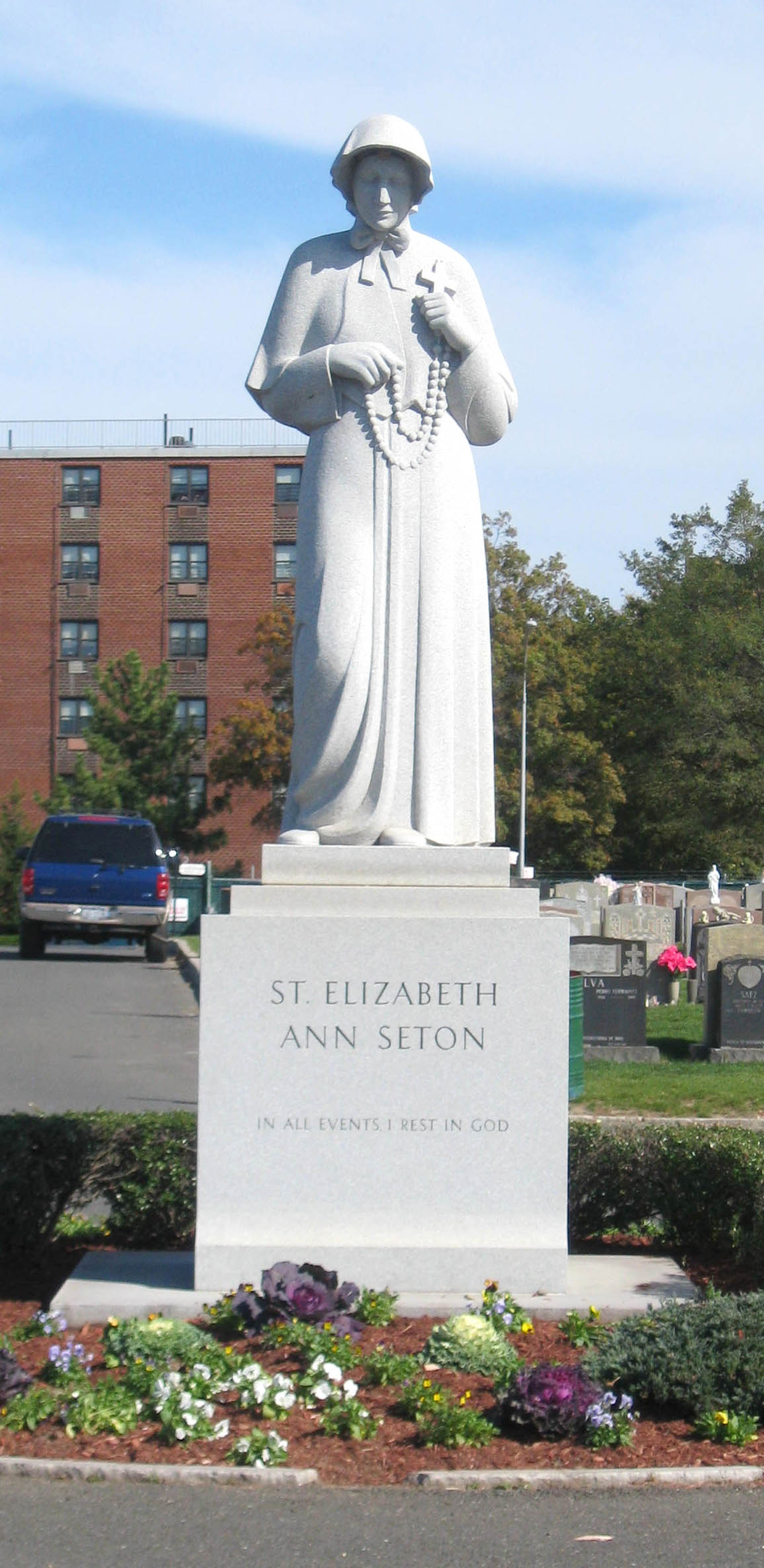
Seton statue, St. Raymond's Cemetery, Bronx, New York

By 1830, the Sisters of Charity of St. Joseph's were running orphanages and schools as far west as Cincinnati, Ohio and New Orleans, Louisiana. They established the first hospital west of the Mississippi in St. Louis, Missouri.

In 1850, the Emmitsburg community merged with the Daughters of Charity of St. Vincent de Paul, becoming their first American branch. Seton in 1979 was inducted into the National Women's Hall of Fame in Seneca Falls, New York.

As of 2026, six other independent congregations started by the sisters are still operating;

- Sisters of Charity of New York – founded in 1817
- Sisters of Charity of Saint Vincent de Paul, Halifax, Nova Scotia – founded in 1849
- The Sisters of Charity of Saint Elizabeth, Convent Station, New Jersey – founded in 1859
- Sisters of Charity of Seton Hill, Greensburg, Pennsylvania – founded in 1870
- Sisters of Charity of Cincinnati – founded in 1897

== Veneration ==
=== Beatification ===
Cardinal James Gibbons of Baltimore in 1882 celebrated a mass at St. Joseph's Church in Emmitsburg. After the mass, he told the attending members of the Sisters of Charity of St. Joseph's that he was opening the cause for canonization for Seton. The Archdiocese of Baltimore then began studying Seton's writings and interviewing people about her. A panel of theologians at the Vatican approved Seton's spiritual writings in 1936. Pope Pius XII issued the Decree of Introduction in 1940, granting Seton the title of Servant of God.

In 1951, four-year-old Ann Teresa O’Neill from Baltimore was diagnosed with acute lymphatic leukemia; doctors said that her condition was terminal. Her Catholic parents transported the child to Emmitsburg, where they laid her on Seton's tomb and started praying for Seton's intercession. Her condition started to improve within a few days. Bone marrow tests over the next few years showed that she was in remission.

After an extensive investigation, the Vatican certified that the O'Neil case was a genuine miracle. Seton was beatified by Pope John XXIII on March 17, 1963. The pope said on the occasion,

"In a house that was very small, but with ample space for charity, she sowed a seed in America which by Divine Grace grew into a large tree."

=== Canonization ===
In October 1963, 61-year-old Carl Kalin was hospitalized at St. Joseph's Hospital in Yonkers, New York. He had been comatose for five days due to an untreatable brain disease. The Sisters of Charity of New York had been praying to Seton for her intercession with Kalin. They brought a first-class relic of Seton, a sliver of her bone, to Kalin's bedside and placed it on his body. Within a day, Kalin emerged from his coma and completely recovered. There was no medical explanation for his cure. After the Vatican verified that the Kalin case was a miracle, Pope Paul VI canonized Seton on September 14, 1975, in a ceremony in St. Peter's Square in Vatican City. The pope remarked,

"Elizabeth Ann Seton is a saint. St. Elizabeth Ann Seton is an American. All of us say this with special joy and with the intention of honoring the land and the nation from which she sprang forth as the first flower in the calendar of the saints. Elizabeth Ann Seton was wholly American! Rejoice for your glorious daughter. Be proud of her. And know how to preserve her fruitful heritage."

Seton became the first native-born American to be declared a saint. US President Gerald R. Ford declared September 14 as National Saint Elizabeth Seton Day. Seton's feast day is January 4, the eleventh day of Christmastide and the anniversary of her death. Seton is honored on the liturgical calendar of the Episcopal Church in the United States of America on January 4.

== Eponymous institutions ==
=== Medical facilities ===
- AHMC Seton Medical Center, Daly City, California
- Ascension Seton, Austin, Texas
- Bayley Seton Hospital, Staten Island, New York – Founded in 1980. Now the Bayley Seton campus of Richmond University Medical Center
- Elizabeth Seton Children's Center, Yonkers, New York
- Elizabeth Ann Seton Hospital, Waterville, Maine – founded in 1965
- Elizabeth Seton Pediatric Center, New York City
- Bayley Senior Care Cincinnati, Ohio

=== Schools ===
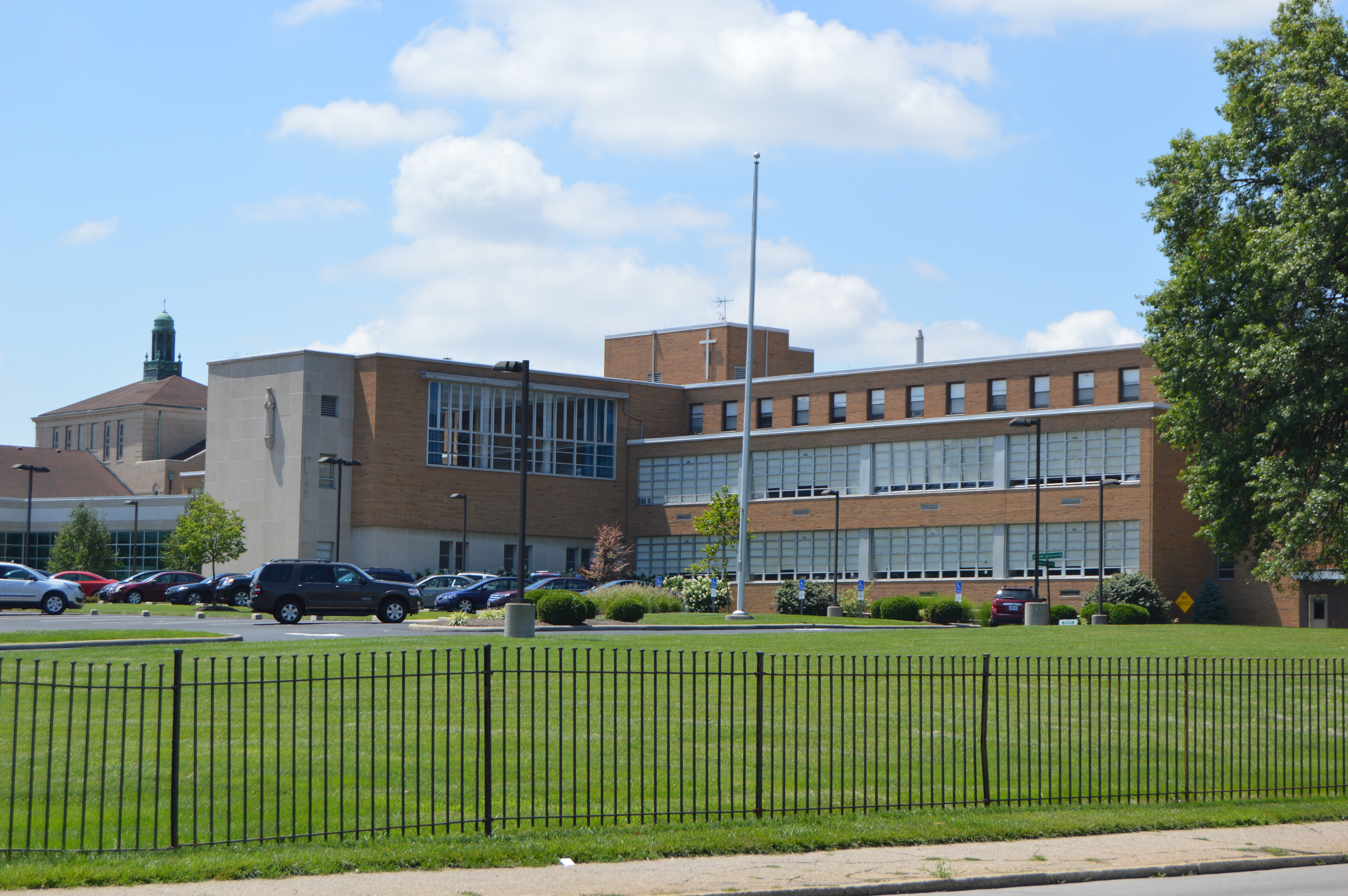
Seton High School, Cincinnati, Ohio

- Academy of Saint Elizabeth, Convent Station, New Jersey – founded in 1860
- Elizabeth Seton College, Yonkers, New York – founded in 1961, merged with Iona College in 1989
- Elizabeth Seton High School, Bladensburg, Maryland – founded in 1959
- Elizabeth Seton School, Las Piñas, Philippines – founded in 1975
- Mother Seton Academy, Baltimore, Maryland
- Mother Seton School, Emmitsburg, Maryland
- Saint Elizabeth University, Morris Township, New Jersey – founded in 1899
- Seton Academy, South Holland, Illinois – founded in 1963 closed in 2016
- Seton Catholic College, Perth, Western Australia – founded in 1990.
- Seton Catholic High School, Pittston, Pennsylvania – founded in 1900 closed in 2007
- Seton Catholic School, Hudson, Ohio – founded in 1997
- Seton Hall University, South Orange, New Jersey – founded in 1856
- Seton Hall Preparatory School, West Orange, New Jersey – founded in 1856
- Seton High School, Cincinnati, Ohio – Founded in 1927
- Seton Hill University, Greensburg, Pennsylvania – founded in 1885
- Seton Home Study School, Front Royal, Virginia – founded in 1983
- Seton LaSalle Catholic High School, Pittsburgh, Pennsylvania – founded in 1980
- Seton Junior-Senior High School, Manassas, Virginia – founded in 1975
- St. Elizabeth Seton Catholic Elementary/Junior High School, Edmonton, Alberta
- St. Seton's Secondary School, Dublin, Ireland – founded in 2023

=== Churches ===
- Seton Parish, North Pickerington, Ohio – founded in 1978
- St. Elizabeth Ann Seton Parish, Shrub Oak, New York – established in 1963
- St. Elizabeth Ann Seton Church, Fayetteville, North Carolina
- St. Elizabeth Ann Seton Catholic Church, Crofton, Maryland – founded in 1975.
- St. Elizabeth Ann Seton Catholic Church, Lake Ronkonkoma, New York – Founded in 1988
- St. Elizabeth Ann Seton Catholic Church, Baldwinsville, New York
- St. Elizabeth Ann Seton Catholic Church, Lake Ridge, Virginia
- St. Elizabeth Ann Seton Catholic Church, Gardendale, Alabama
- The Catholic Community of St. Elizabeth Ann Seton, Plano, Texas

=== Buildings ===
- Elizabeth Ann Seton Center for Women’s Studies, Seton Hall University
- Elizabeth Ann Seton Hall, Sacred Heart University, Fairfield, Connecticut
- Elizabeth Seton Library, University of Mount Saint Vincent, New York City
- Elizabeth Ann Seton Wing, Catholic University of America, Washington, D.C.
- Seton College, University of Mount Saint Vincent
- Seton Hall, Niagara University,Lewiston, New York
- Seton Hall, DePaul University, Chicago, Illinois

=== Charities ===
Seton Villa, Sydney, Australia – provides accommodation for women with disabilities, founded in 1966 by the Daughters of Charity of St Vincent de Paul

== Film biographies ==
Several films have been on the life of Seton. One was the 2025 mini-documentary made by the communication team at Seton Hall University. In 1980, the U.S. made-for-television biographical drama film about Seton, A Time for Miracles, was released on national television.

== See also ==
- Saint Elizabeth Ann Seton, patron saint archive

== Collected writings ==
- Bayley Seton, Elizabeth (2000). Bechtle, Regina; Metz, Judith (eds.). Collected Writings. Vol. I: Correspondence and Journals 1793–1808. New York: New City Press. ISBN 1-56548-148-8.
- Bayley Seton, Elizabeth (2002). Bechtle, Regina; Metz, Judith (eds.). Collected Writings. Vol. II: Correspondence and Journals 1808–1820. New York: New City Press. ISBN 1-56548-170-4.
- Bayley Seton, Elizabeth (2006). Bechtle, Regina; Metz, Judith (eds.). Collected Writings. Vol. IIIa: Spiritual Writings, Notebooks, and Other Documents. New York: New City Press. ISBN 1-56548-249-2.
- Bayley Seton, Elizabeth (2006). Bechtle, Regina; Metz, Judith (eds.). Collected Writings. Vol. IIIb: Spiritual Writings, Notebooks, and Other Documents. New York: New City Press. ISBN 1-56548-249-2.
