= Sisters of Charity of Cincinnati =

Religious organization founded in Ohio, US

The Sisters of Charity of Cincinnati were founded in 1852 by Mother Margaret Farrell George, by the separation of the community from the Sisters of Charity in Emmitsburg, Maryland. The motherhouse of the community is at Mount Saint Joseph, Ohio.

== History ==
Catholics were few and far between in Cincinnati and throughout Ohio in the early decades of the nineteenth century. Most were poor Germans, but their number also included many of Swiss and Irish descent. The area around Cincinnati was initially part of the diocese of Bardstown, Kentucky. On 19 June 1821 the diocese of Cincinnati was created with Edward D. Fenwick appointed the first bishop.

The religious community of the Sisters of Charity was founded by Elizabeth Ann Seton in 1809 in Emmitsburg, Maryland. It was the first community of religious women native to the United States. In 1829, four Sisters of Charity from Emmitsburg traveled 15 days by stage coach to Cincinnati, Ohio, at the request of Bishop Fenwick. At that time the Diocese of Cincinnati encompassed all of the state of Ohio and Michigan Territory. The sisters opened St. Peter's Girl's Orphan Asylum and School.

Cincinnati experienced serious cholera epidemics in 1832–33 and in the summer of 1849. In the summer of 1833 alone, Cincinnati averaged 40 deaths per day, with the immigrant population most heavily affected. Estimates are that 4 percent of the city's population died during this epidemic. The Sisters responded by providing health care and by caring for the suddenly increased numbers of orphans. In addition to the school and orphanage, they were involved in the “Mary and Martha Society” to visit the sick.

Superiors at Emmitsburg decided in 1850 to establish formal affiliation with the Daughters of Charity based in France, but seven Sisters in Cincinnati, including Superior Margaret Cecilia Farrell George, voted to decline affiliation on the basis that their foundress, Elizabeth Seton, intended that the community she founded be based in America. Sister Margaret George had entered the community at Emmitsburg early in 1812 and had filled the office of treasurer and secretary of the community, teaching in the academy during most of Mother Seton's life. The Sisters of Charity of Cincinnati became an independent diocesan order. Soon after foundation of the diocesan community, the Sisters opened St. Vincent's Asylum for Boys. In 1854 the Sisters founded Mount St. Vincent's Academy, Cedar Grove, Price Hill, which later became Seton High School. A mission in Dayton, Ohio, was established in 1857. In 1920 the Sisters founded the College of Mount St. Joseph, now known as Mount St. Joseph University, in Delhi, Ohio, the first Catholic college for women in Hamilton County, Ohio.

In 1852, Archbishop John Purcell recognized the need for a hospital that would provide care to people who couldn't afford medical treatment. He bought a 21-bed hospital and turned it over to the Sisters of Charity of Cincinnati. The hospital, named St. John's Hotel for Invalids, was the first private hospital in Cincinnati. Within three years, the sisters needed a larger facility so they moved to a former mansion at Third and Plum Streets. St. John's Hospital, as it became known, cared for many injured men and women during the Civil War from 1861-1865.

When the Civil War broke out, the sisters volunteered as nurses. Over one-third of the community, by then numbering more than 100, saw active service both on the eastern front in Ohio, Maryland, and Virginia, and on the western front in Mississippi, Kentucky, and Tennessee. A request was made from Cumberland, Virginia, for nursing assistance, and eight sisters were sent to serve the wounded of both armies.

A local banker, Joseph C. Butler, had referred a man with typhoid fever to St. John's and offered to pay for his care. The Sisters refused to accept payment, and after the war in 1866 Butler and a friend, Louis Worthington, bought a large facility, the former Cincinnati Marine Hospital, to present to the sisters on two conditions: that no one be excluded from the hospital because of color or religion, and that the hospital be named “The Hospital of the Good Samaritan,” to honor the sisters’ kindness. The 95-bed hospital opened in 1866.

== Sr. Anthony O'Connell ==
Sister Anthony O'Connell, SC (15 August 1812 – 8 December 1897), served with distinction as a nurse on the front lines of the American Civil War. Sister O'Connell was born Mary Ellen O'Connell in Limerick, Ireland. In 1821 she emigrated with her family to Boston. On 5 June 1835 she entered the novitiate of the Sisters of Charity at Emmitsburg and was professed in 1837. Soon after, she went to Cincinnati. In June 1861 Sister O'Connell was one of six Sisters of Charity who went to Camp Dennison, about 15 miles from Cincinnati. She became personally acquainted with Jefferson Davis and knew a number of generals on both sides of the conflict. Her medical skills allowed her to intervene to save soldiers' limbs from amputation. The battle of Shiloh brought ten sisters to the scene including Sr. Anthony. Some describe Sr. Anthony's word as being law with officers, doctors, and soldiers once she had established herself as a prudent and trusted administrator and nurse. She and other sisters often were picked to treat wounded prisoners of war since they showed no bias in serving rebel, yank, white, or black soldiers. Her portrait hangs in the Smithsonian Institution in Washington, DC.

== Ministry ==
Immediately following the war, four sisters went to Santa Fe to open St. Vincent's, the first hospital in the New Mexico Territory. As the community continued to grow it was able to offer assistance in the establishment of the Sisters of Charity of Seton Hill in Greensburg, Pennsylvania (1870).

The first sisters were sent to Michigan in 1872. In the 1920s the community decided to change its status from a diocesan to a papal community. This led to the adoption of new constitutions and a change of habit.

In 2011, the Sisters of Charity of Cincinnati founded DePaul Cristo Rey High School. Sisters of Charity of Cincinnati live and minister throughout the United States, Mexico, Guatemala, and Dominica. The congregation sponsors the College of Mount St. Joseph in Cincinnati, Ohio, along with Bayley Place, a continuing care retirement community.

The SC Ministry Foundation evolved from the former Sisters of Charity Health Care Foundation, established in 1986. SC Ministry Foundation, a public grant-making organization that promotes the mission and ministry of the Sisters of Charity of Cincinnati, received the Champion award from Catholic Legal Immigration Network, Inc. (CLINIC) on 24 May 2012, in Austin, Texas.

As of 2019, there were 275 members of the Sisters of Charity of Cincinnati serving in twelve US states and two foreign countries.

== See also ==
- Good Samaritan Hospital (Cincinnati)
- Sisters of Charity of Seton Hill
