= Angela Hughes =

Irish-American nun

Mother Angela Hughes

Personal life
- Born: Ellen Hughes; 1806 Annaloghan, County Tyrone, Ireland
- Died: 5 September 1866 (aged 59–60) Manhattan, New York City, United States

Religious life
- Religion: Christian
- Order: Sisters of Charity of New York

Mother Angela Hughes (1806 – 5 September 1866) was an Irish-American Sisters of Charity of New York nun, and was the first superior of St Vincent's Hospital in New York City.

== Biography ==
Angela Hughes was born Ellen Hughes in 1806 in Annaloghan, County Tyrone. She was one of the seven children of Patrick and Margaret Hughes (née McKenna). She had two sisters and four brothers. Hughes, her mother and her sisters emigrated to Chambersburg, Pennsylvania in 1819, when Hughes was 13. Her father and brothers had already moved there in 1817. She was educated in St Joseph's Academy, nearby Emmitsburg, Maryland from 1823, entering the Sisters of Charity convent in Emmitsburg in 1825. In 1828 she professed as Sister Mary Angela, and began her work, mostly with orphan children. She worked in the first catholic hospital in the United States, Mullanphy Hospital in St Louis, Missouri, from 1833 to 1837.

The Sisters came into conflict with Hughes' older brother, bishop John Hughes, in 1846 when the sisters intended to withdraw from working with a city orphanage. The resolution of the dispute saw the congregation split, with Hughes and 32 other Sisters remaining at the orphanage under the auspices of Archbishop Hughes. The other 29 Sisters returned to Emmitsburg. The New York Sisters formed a new diocesan congregation, the Sisters of Charity of New York. Hughes was popular and a candidate for superior, but her brother forbade her from being the first superior. In 1849, during the cholera epidemic, Hughes was assistant to the Mother General, Elizabeth Boyle. She was then appointed to found St Vincent's Hospital in New York City, becoming its first superior. She left this post in December 1855 when she was elected third mother general of her community. In this post she moved the motherhouse to Riverdale in the Bronx, and oversaw the opening of 15 schools and convents. In 1861, she returned to take up the position as superior of St Vincent's Hospital again. She remained in this post until her death, on 5 September 1866.
