= Sisters of Charity of New York =

Religious congregation founded in Maryland, US

- Named after: Daughters of Charity
- Formation: 1809; Began completion in 2023
- Founder: St. Elizabeth Ann Seton
- Founded at: Emmitsburg, Maryland
- Type: Catholic religious institute
- Headquarters: Mount Saint Vincent Convent
- President: Jane Iannucelli, SC
- Parent organization: Sisters of Charity Federation in the Vincentian-Setonian Tradition
- Website: www.scny.org

The Sisters of Charity of Saint Vincent de Paul of New York, best known as the Sisters of Charity of New York, is a religious congregation of sisters in the Catholic Church whose primary missions are education and nursing, and who are dedicated in particular to service of the poor. Their motherhouse is located on the grounds of the University of Mount Saint Vincent in the Riverdale section of the Bronx. They were founded by Elizabeth Ann Seton in 1809, and in April 2023 announced they would cease accepting new members and begin winding down their congregation.

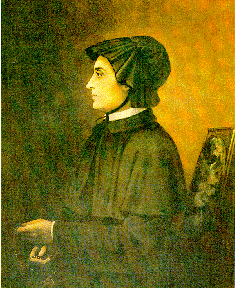
Saint Elizabeth Ann Seton (1774 – 1821)

== History ==
Saint Elizabeth Seton founded the Sisters of Charity in Emmitsburg, Maryland, in 1809, modeling her foundation on the Daughters of Charity founded in France by Saint Vincent de Paul and Saint Louise de Marillac in the 17th century. The Sisters followed the Vincentian practice of taking temporary religious vows of poverty, chastity, and obedience, renewing these annually (in contrast to most orders of religious women, who at some point take permanent or "perpetual" vows). This practice lasted until 1938, when the congregation adopted the more standard practice of professing lifetime vows.

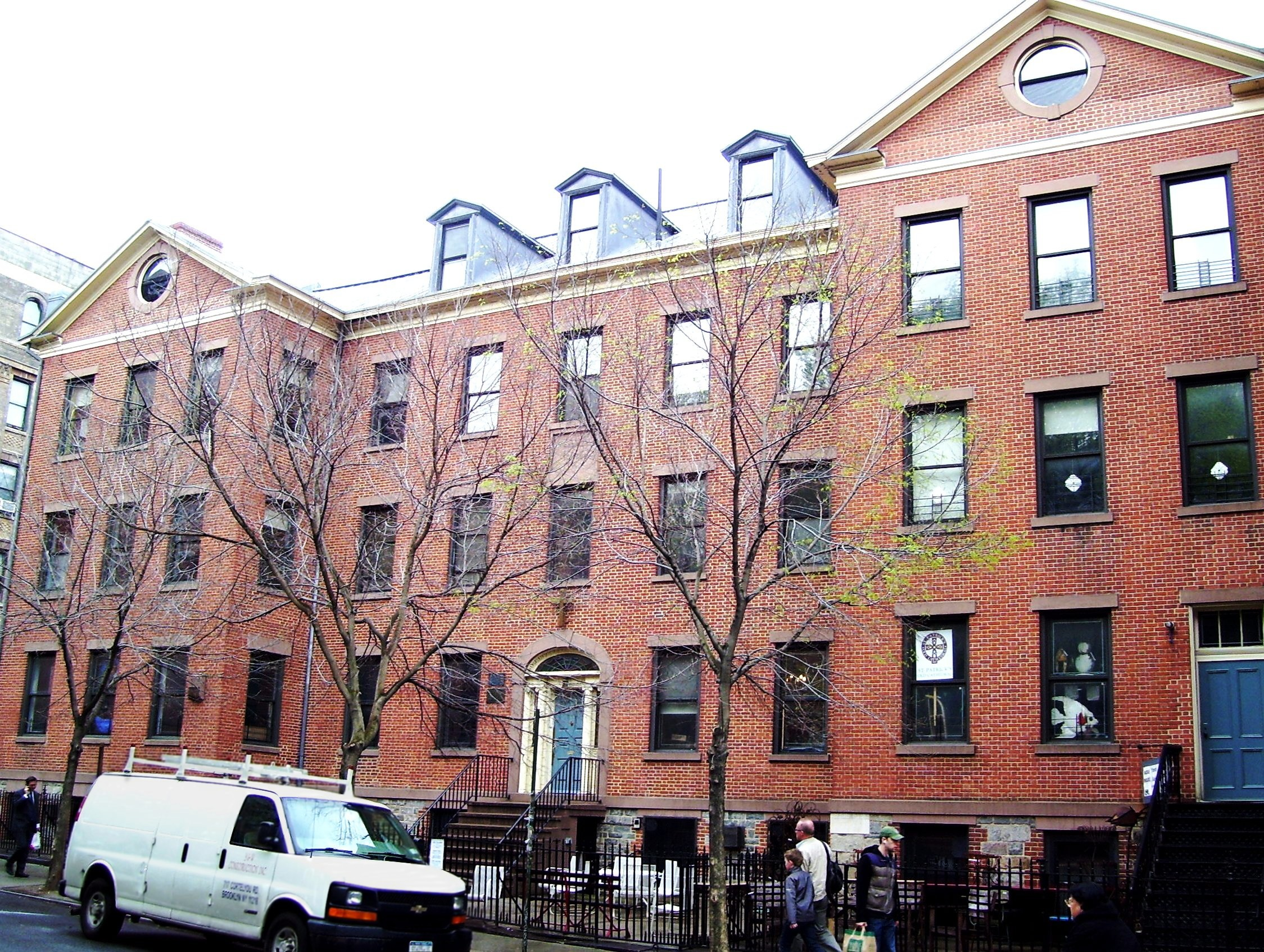
St. Patrick's Convent and Girls' School

In 1814, Mother Seton sent three sisters to care for orphans after receiving a request from clergy in Philadelphia. In 1817, three Sisters were sent to New York City (which was Seton's hometown) to establish an orphanage, at the corner of Prince and Mott Streets. The Sisters quickly took on the job of establishing Catholic orphanages in a city overrun with abandoned, orphaned or neglected children. Mother Seton had established one of the first Catholic elementary schools in Emmitsburg. With this background, the Sisters also began to establish or staff existing parish schools, particularly in poor and immigrant neighborhoods, and to set up hospitals. Some of the earliest, sustained social service institutions and health care facilities in New York City were started by the sisters.

The motherhouse at Emmitsburg negotiated for affiliation with the Daughters of Charity in France. In consequence there developed a tendency to dispense with certain customs observed at Emmitsburg because these changes were required by the French superiors; for example, the sisters in charge of boys' asylums were everywhere to be withdrawn. The measure threatened at that period the very existence of the New York orphanage. The allegiance of the sisters to local Catholics in New York came in conflict with their obedience to their superiors in Emmitsburg, eventually leading to the establishment of a separate order recognized as the Sisters of Charity of New York (SCNY).

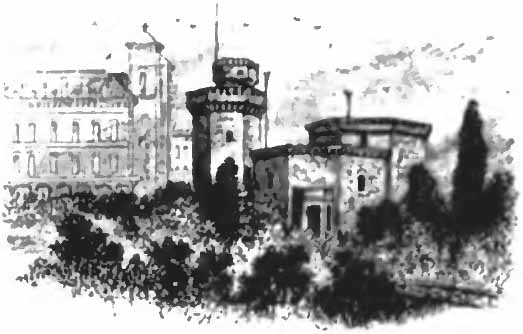
Forrest's Font Hill by the Hudson River

In 1846, the Sisters in New York incorporated as a separate entity from the Sisters of Charity still based in Maryland. Mother Elizabeth Boyle was the first Mother Superior, succeeded by Mother Jerome Ely. They became the Sisters of Charity of New York. This was not unusual, in that several other groups of Sisters founded by Seton established themselves as independent diocesan entities once their communities reached maturity. The novitiate of the New York community was opened at St. James's Academy, 35 East Broadway, and later moved to the new motherhouse on an estate purchased at Mcgown's Pass, situated within the limits of the present Central Park. Here, in 1847, the Academy of Mount Saint Vincent had its foundation. In the late 1850s the sisters bought the Edwin Forrest estate called Font Hill and the Motherhouse and academy relocated to the Riverdale section of the Bronx. In 1857 Holy Cross Academy, a boarding school for young ladies, had its foundation in New York City.

In 1849 four sisters were sent from Mount Saint Vincent to Halifax, Nova Scotia. The Sisters of Charity of Halifax became an independent congregation in 1856. In 1890 the Sisters of Saint Martha of Antigonish evolved from the Halifax congregation as an order initially devoted to housekeeping and nursing duties at St. Francis Xavier University.

In 1856, under Mother Mary Xavier Mehegan, a local community was formed of the sisters then labouring in the Diocese of Newark.

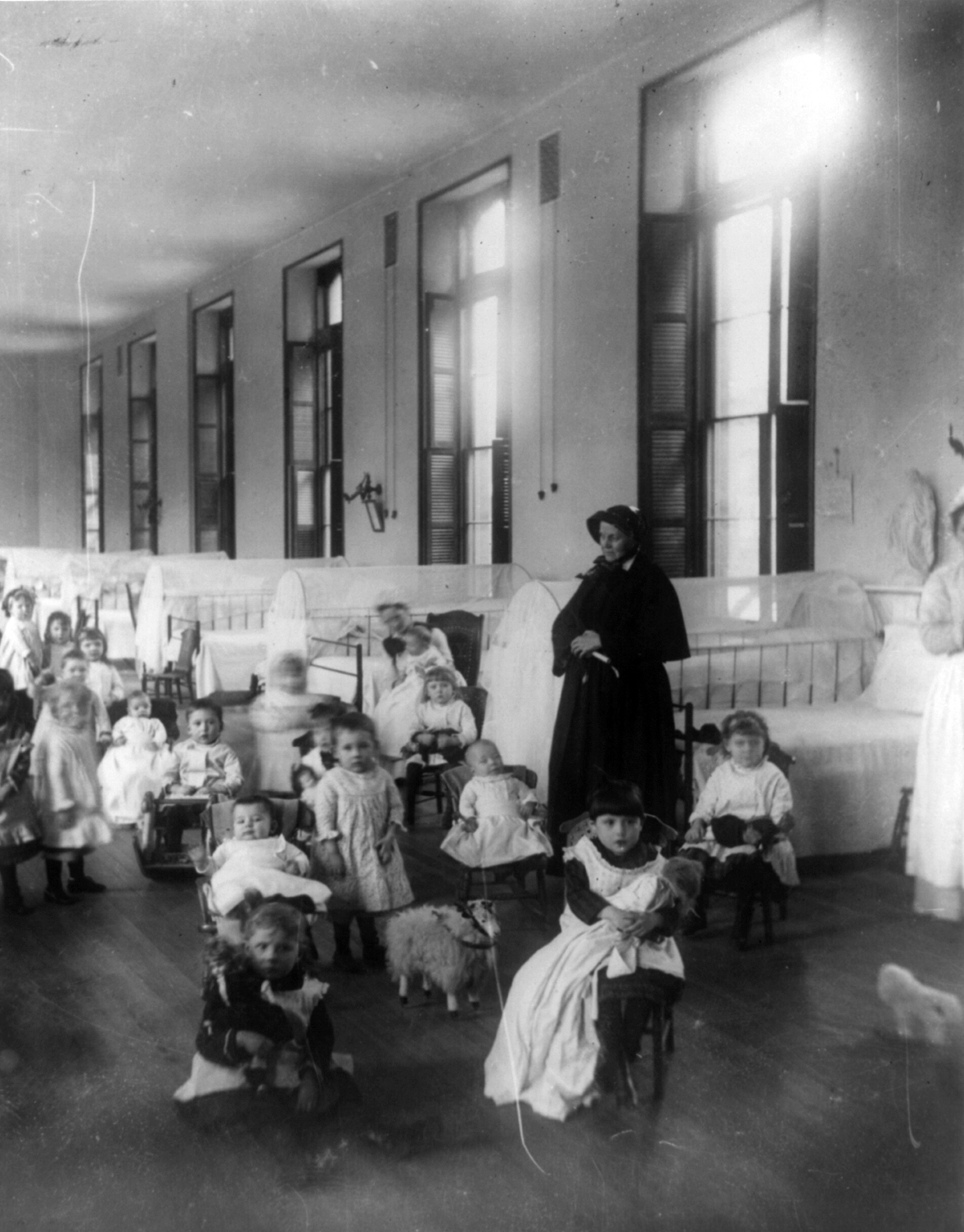
Sister Irene and children at New York Foundling, 1888

As immigrants arrived in poverty during the 19th century, the sisters became known for accepting newborns at the doorsteps of the convent. The Sisters in New York established The New York Foundling in 1869, an orphanage for abandoned children but also a place for unmarried mothers to receive care themselves and offer their children for adoption. (New York immigrant communities were plagued by prostitution rings that preyed on young women, and out-of-wedlock pregnancies were a severe problem in these communities.) New York Foundling continues its work today and is noted for its work with babies and young children infected with HIV, and also with severely handicapped children.

In 1855, Archbishop John Hughes' sister, Mary Angela Hughes became Superior of the Sisters in New York. It was during Mother Angela's tenure that the Sisters of Charity of Newark branched off as a separate congregation. The cholera epidemic of 1849 impelled the Sisters to open St. Vincent's Hospital in Manhattan (closed 2010), the first Catholic hospital in New York City. St. Vincent's Hospital became the centerpiece of an extensive health care system under the Sisters' care that included St. Vincent's Hospital in Westchester (a psychiatric hospital) as well as two hospitals on Staten Island: St. Vincent's Hospital (closed 2006) and Bayley Seton Hospital, in addition to a network of nursing homes and other institutions.

In 1862, the sisters nursed Civil War wounded in St. Joseph's Military Hospital, former site of Mt. St. Vincent in Central Park. The hospital closed in 1865.

The Sisters were also the key congregation in the establishment of New York's parochial school system, staffing more schools than any other single order of women. In addition to parish schools (which, in New York, typically carry children through grade 8), the sisters ran a number of high schools themselves or provided staff for high schools run by others, and they established the College of Mount Saint Vincent, which also serves as their motherhouse. They also founded St. Joseph by the Sea High School on Staten Island. Beginning as a summer retreat for orphans from the Foundling Hospital and as a place for the sisters to obtain degrees under the auspices of Mount St. Vincent, it was turned into an all-girls Catholic high school in 1963. Now co-ed, it is still staffed by a number of Sisters of Charity.

In 1958, the Congregation opened the Convent of Mary the Queen in Yonkers as a residence for Senior Sisters.

The Sisters of Charity of New York is a constituent community of the Federation of Sisters of Charity in the Vincentian-Setonian Tradition, an umbrella group that brings together the various congregations that trace their roots back to Saint Elizabeth Seton, and ultimately to Saint Vincent de Paul.

In April 2023, the Sisters announced that they would cease accepting new sister candidates and would begin winding down their congregation. According to the Riverdale Press, no one had sought to join the sisterhood in more than 20 years, and "the median age of the sisters is 82". As of 2023, there were 154 members of the congregation.

== Mission ==
The website of the Sisters of Charity of New York states the congregation's mission as follows:

The Mission of the Sisters of Charity is to share in the ongoing mission of Jesus by responding to the signs of the times in the spirit of St. Vincent de Paul and St. Elizabeth Ann Seton, by revealing the Father's love in our lives and in our varied ministries with and for all in need, especially those living in poverty.

== Ministries ==
The congregation's traditional ministries have been in education, healthcare, and child care. However, members have expanded their ministries to include parish ministries; spiritual direction and retreat opportunities; and homeless, new immigrant, and women's centers. The sisters are active in ecological concerns, and sponsor a number of affordable housing facilities for those in need.

Close Up was the inaugural magazine of the Sisters of Charity of New York. Close Up has since ceased operation. But the Sisters have launched Vision magazine. Vision is released quarterly with Winter, Spring, Summer, and Fall issues. Vision has interviews, features, and stories concerning the Sisters of Charity of New York. The writing team of Vision consists of Sisters, associates, and those that work with the Sisters of Charity of New York. In February 2018, the Sisters of Charity of New York celebrated thirty years of publication.

== In popular culture ==
Sisters of Charity of New York were main characters in the 2005 Pulitzer-Prize winning play Doubt: A Parable, which was the basis of the 2008 film of the same name.

== See also ==
- Sisters of Charity of Saint Elizabeth - Convent Station, New Jersey
