= Sisters of Saint Martha =

The Sisters of St. Martha were founded as a religious congregation in 1900 at Antigonish, Nova Scotia. The Sisters of St. Martha are members of the Sisters of Charity Federation.

== History ==
The Sisters of St. Martha were formally established as a religious congregation in 1900. The first members came from a group of women who had responded to a call in 1894 from Bishop of Antigonish John Cameron. They were to be part of an auxiliary congregation of the Sisters of Charity of Saint Vincent de Paul (Halifax) in Halifax, and prepared for the ministry of household management at St. Francis Xavier College. Back in the 1880s and 90's, St. Francis Xavier College, established in 1855 in Antigonish, Nova Scotia, faced financial trouble because of difficulties in obtaining and keeping a permanent staff for the household needs of the university. At that time the college was a preseminary for young men as well as a regular academic college.

Mother Fidelis, the Superior General of the Sisters of Charity at the time the sisters were to come to Antigonish in 1897, maintained that the ‘Sisterhood” of the auxiliary sisters had been established a year before Bishop Cameron asked the Sisters of Charity to include St. F.X. University among the institutes managed by the members of the auxiliary sisters. Both views could be correct. In 1894, the development of the institute of auxiliary sisters was in an early stage. Their novitiate seems to have been at the Sisters of Charity convent in Wellesley, Massachusetts, and possibly the novitiate had no more than five members. It appears that, after the order's agreement with Bishop Cameron, the novitiate was transferred to the motherhouse in Halifax in order to receive the candidates from the Diocese of Antigonish, as well as candidates from other dioceses. The basic spiritual formation of the candidates, as well as training in work skills, was provided by a novice mistress and a mistress of work, both Sisters of Charity. The auxiliary Sisters of St. Martha had their own rules and regulations, distinct from the Sisters of Charity.

In 1897 a group of sisters, known as the Sisters of Saint Martha, came to Saint Francis Xavier College; they were still under the direction of the Sisters of Charity. The sisters worked in the household department of St. Francis Xavier, reorganizing, cooking, cleaning, and caring for the sick in the university infirmary. In 1900 Bishop Cameron expressed a wish to establish a separate congregation for Saint Francis Xavier College from among the sisters of the Antigonish diocese who had entered and trained in Halifax. During a retreat, the sisters were invited to establish themselves as a new and separate religious institute and to indicate their choice by standing. Thirteen women stood.

On July 16, 1900, the first volunteers arrived in Antigonish and continued to support the seminary, also expanding their medical services to the community.

In 1906, the sisters were invited to open their first hospital. Care of homeless and neglected children began in 1917, followed by care of unmarried mothers and, later, by family social services. Teaching in rural schools began in 1925. In later years the congregation extended its service to include diversified forms of social work and pastoral ministry.

After the Second Vatican Council the Sisters of Saint Martha experienced challenges. A decrease in membership brought a reduction in ministries. As the council had encouraged religious congregations to appreciate their founding charisms, sacrifices were made and congregation resources were stretched to enable sisters to engage in theological studies, periods of spiritual renewal, spirituality programs and sabbath time. Renewal Centers were established, offering sacred space where laity and religious could gather for personal and communal renewal.

== Present day ==
In the year 2000, the congregation marked the centenary of their founding.

Since 2013, land behind the motherhouse has been utilized in the congregations's "New Growers Program" for market gardens.

In 2018 the fifty-eight sisters living at the Bethany motherhouse relocated to the nearby Parkland Antigonish, a senior residence facility. The motherhouse was demolished and the site redeveloped as a park, Bethany Centennial Garden.

The Sisters of St. Martha serve in Nova Scotia, Quebec, and Alberta as social workers, in spirituality programs and in street ministry.
