= List of archbishops of New York =

Archbishops of the Catholic Archdiocese of New York

Archbishop of New York
- Archbishopric

catholic
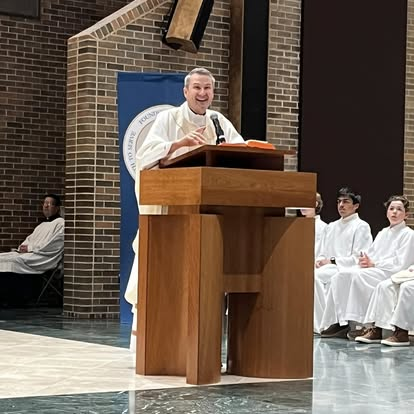
- Ronald Hicks, the Archbishop of New York since 2026

- The coat of arms of the Archdiocese of New York
- Incumbent: Ronald Hicks

Information
- First holder: R. Luke Concanen (bishop); John Hughes (archbishop)
- Denomination: Catholic Church
- Sui iuris church: Latin Church
- Established: 1808 (bishopric); 1850 (archbishopric)
- Archdiocese: New York
- Cathedral: St. Patrick's Cathedral

Website
- archny.org

The Archbishop of New York is the head of the Archdiocese of New York, who is responsible for looking after its spiritual and administrative needs. As the archdiocese is the metropolitan see of the Catholic ecclesiastical province encompassing nearly all of the state of New York, the Archbishop of New York also administers the bishops who head the suffragan dioceses of Albany, Brooklyn, Buffalo, Ogdensburg, Rochester, Rockville Centre and Syracuse. The current archbishop is Ronald Hicks.

The archdiocese began as the Diocese of New York, which was created on April 8, 1808. R. Luke Concanen was appointed its first bishop; however, he was unable to leave the Italian Peninsula due to the Napoleonic Wars and died before he could set out for New York. Under the reign of his successor, John Connolly, a canonical visitation of the diocese was conducted. On account of the population increase due largely to Catholic immigrants from Ireland and Germany, the Holy See decided to elevate the diocese to the status of archdiocese on July 19, 1850. John Hughes became the first archbishop of the newly-formed metropolitan see. Because of the prominence of the position and the challenges that accompany it, Pope John Paul II described the office as "archbishop of the capital of the world." (Note: This has been alternatively quoted as "archbishop of the most powerful country in the world.")

Eleven men have been Archbishop of New York; another three were bishop of its predecessor diocese. Of these, only one (John Dubois) was neither born in Ireland nor was second-generation Irish. Eight archbishops were elevated to the College of Cardinals. John McCloskey, the fifth ordinary of the archdiocese, was the first archbishop to be born in the United States, as well as the first born in what is now New York City. (Note: McCloskey was born in the City of Brooklyn in 1810. It was consolidated with the existing City of New York (consisting of Manhattan and The Bronx), Queens County, and Staten Island in 1898 to form the City of Greater New York (i.e. New York City).) When he was raised to cardinal in 1875, he became the first cardinal from America. Francis Spellman had the longest tenure as Archbishop of New York, serving for 28 years from 1939 to 1967, while Concanen held the position for 26 months (1808–1810), marking the shortest episcopacy.

== List of ordinaries ==
Key
‡	Denotes archbishop who was elevated to the College of Cardinals
OP	Dominican Order
PSS	Society of the Priests of Saint Sulpice

=== Bishops of New York ===
Bishops
From	Until	Incumbent	Notes	Ref.
1808	1810	R. Luke Concanen, OP	Appointed on April 8, 1808. Died on June 19, 1810, having never visited the Diocese. (Note: Between Concanen's death and Connolly's arrival, Fr. Anthony Kohlmann and Fr. Benedict Joseph Fenwick served as diocesan administrators.)	
1814	1825	John Connolly, OP	Appointed on October 4, 1814. Arrived in New York on November 24, 1815. Died on February 6, 1825.	
1826	1842	John Dubois, PSS	Appointed on May 23, 1826. Died on December 20, 1842.	
1842	1850	John Hughes	Coadjutor bishop (Note: Under the Code of Canon Law, the coadjutor bishop has the right of succession (cum jure successionis) upon the death, retirement or resignation of the diocesan bishop he is assisting.) from 1837 to 1842 (Note: Hughes was appointed coadjutor bishop on August 8, 1837, but only received episcopal consecration on January 7, 1838.)	

=== Archbishops of New York ===
Archbishops
From	Until	Incumbent	Notes	Ref.
1850	1864	John Hughes	Became the first Archbishop of New York on July 19, 1850. Died on January 3, 1864.	
1864	1885	John McCloskey^{‡}	Coadjutor archbishop from 1843 to 1847. (Note: McCloskey was appointed coadjutor archbishop on November 21, 1843, but only received episcopal consecration on March 10, 1844.) Translated to Albany on May 21, 1847. Appointed on May 6, 1864. First archbishop to be born in the United States and in New York City. Elevated to cardinal on March 15, 1875. Died on October 10, 1885.	
1885	1902	Michael Corrigan	Coadjutor archbishop from 1880 to 1885. Died on May 5, 1902.	
1902	1918	John Murphy Farley^{‡}	Auxiliary bishop from 1895 to 1902. Elevated to cardinal on November 27, 1911. Died on September 17, 1918.	
1919	1938	Patrick Joseph Hayes^{‡}	Auxiliary bishop from 1914 to 1917. Elevated to cardinal on March 24, 1924. Died on September 4, 1938.	
1939	1967	Francis Spellman^{‡}	Appointed on April 15, 1939. Elevated to cardinal on February 18, 1946. Died on December 2, 1967.	
1968	1983	Terence Cooke^{‡}	Auxiliary bishop from 1965 to 1968. Elevated to cardinal on April 28, 1969. Died on October 6, 1983.	
1984	2000	John O'Connor^{‡}	Appointed on January 26, 1984. Elevated to cardinal on May 25, 1985. Died on May 3, 2000.	(Note: The New York Times lists O'Connor's date of appointment as January 31, 1984. The date used in the Notes column is from the Archdiocese.)
2000	2009	Edward Egan^{‡}	Auxiliary bishop from 1985 to 1988. Elevated to cardinal on February 21, 2001. Retired on February 23, 2009, after reaching the mandatory retirement age of 75. Died on March 5, 2015.	
2009	2025	Timothy M. Dolan^{‡}	Appointed on February 23, 2009. Elevated to cardinal on February 18, 2012. Retired on December 18, 2025, after reaching the mandatory retirement age of 75.	
2026	present	Ronald Hicks	Appointed on December 18, 2025. (Note: Hicks was installed on February 6, 2026.)	

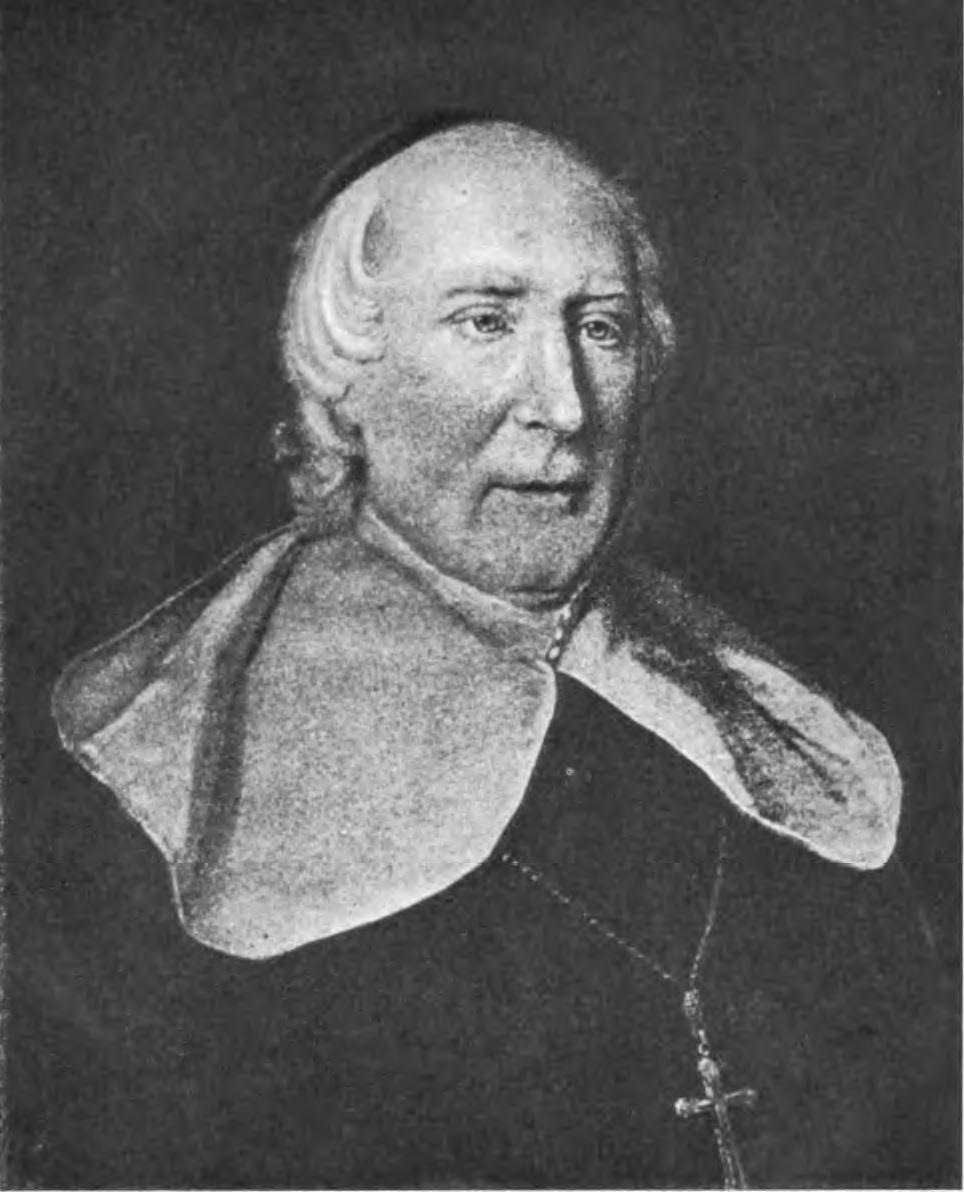
R. Luke Concanen was the first Bishop of New York, but died before he could set foot in the Diocese.

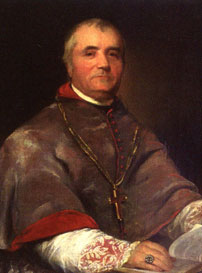
John Dubois was the only non-Irish ordinary of New York.

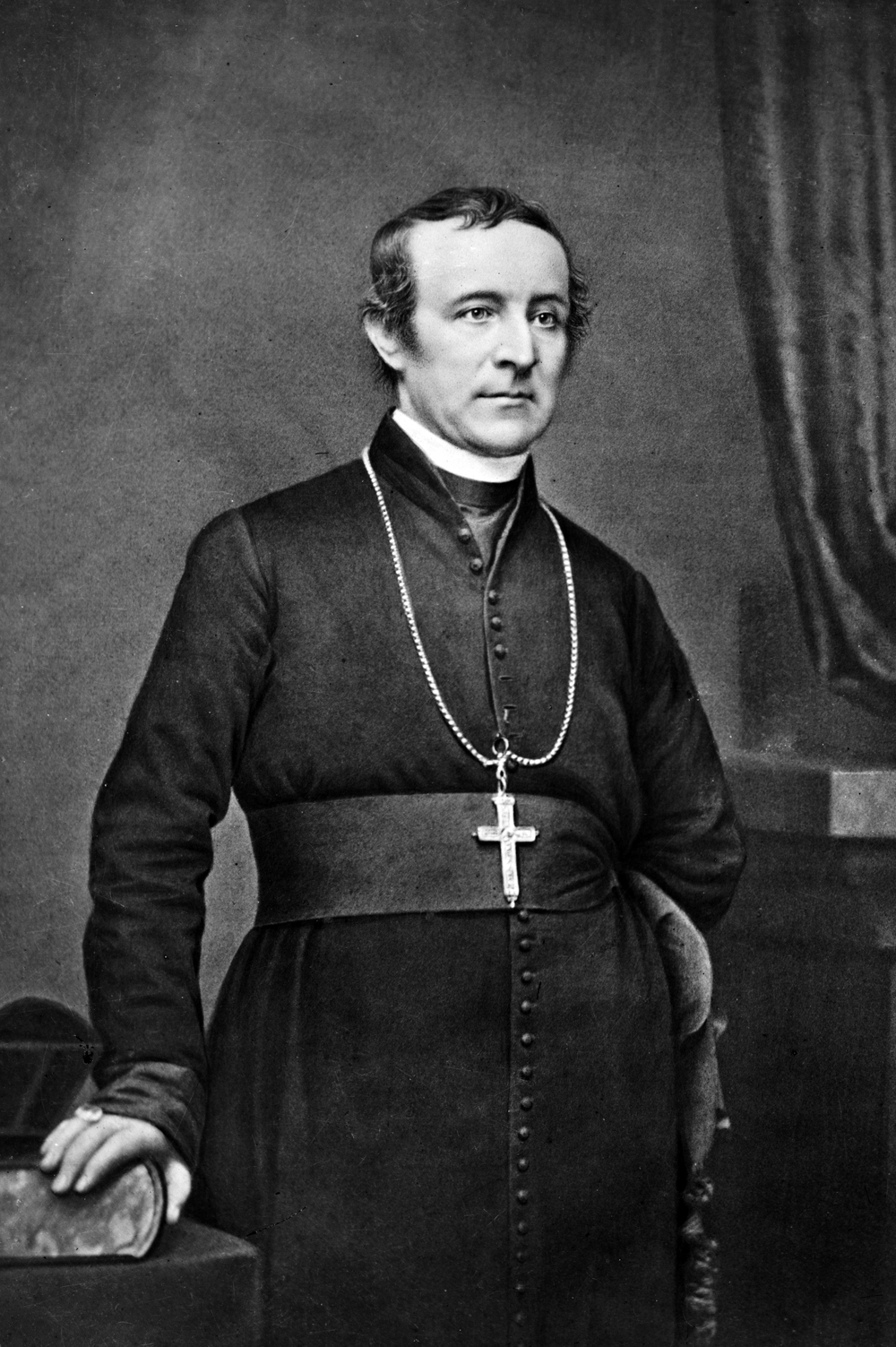
John Hughes was the last Bishop of New York and its first archbishop.

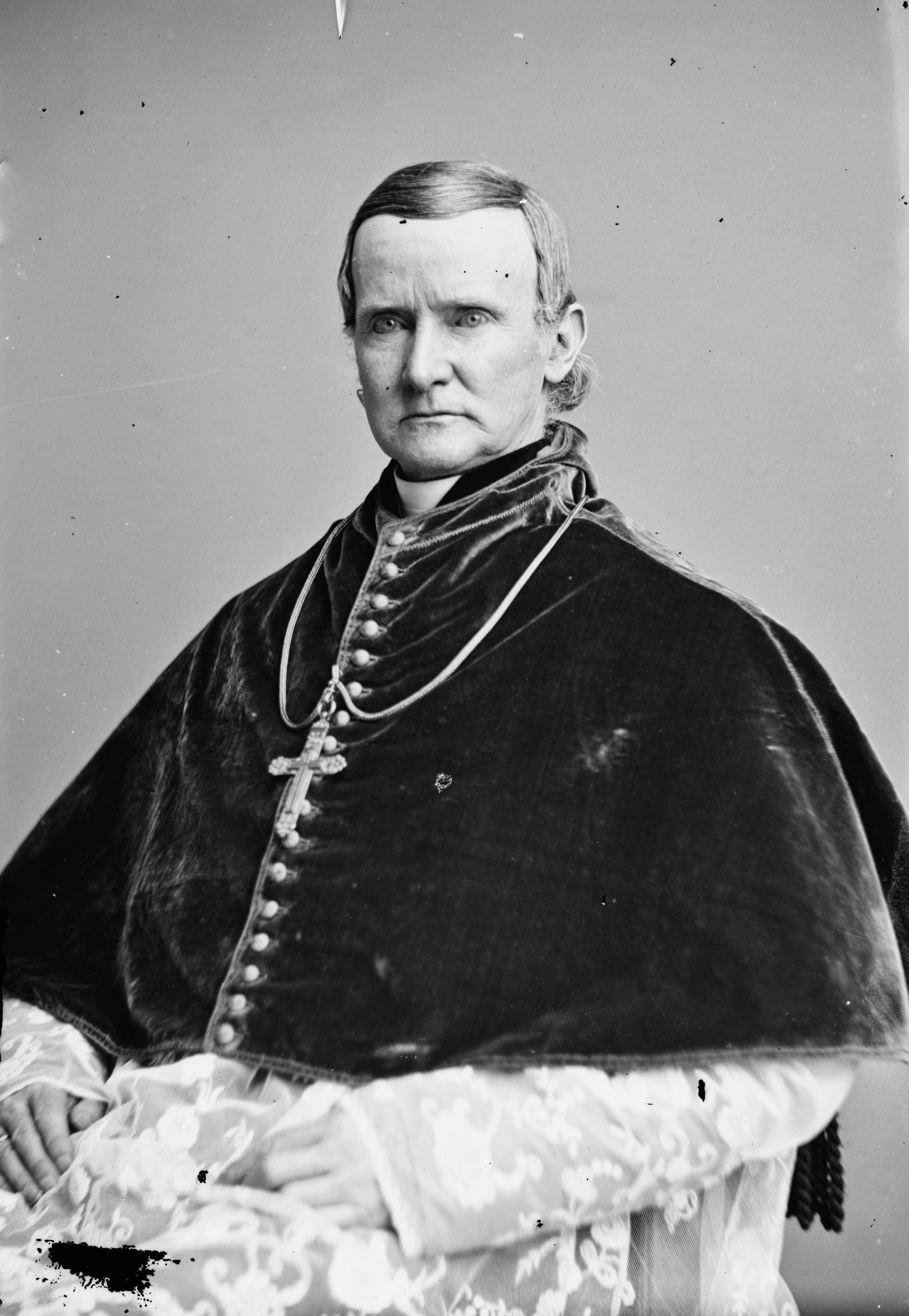
John McCloskey became the first American cardinal in 1875.

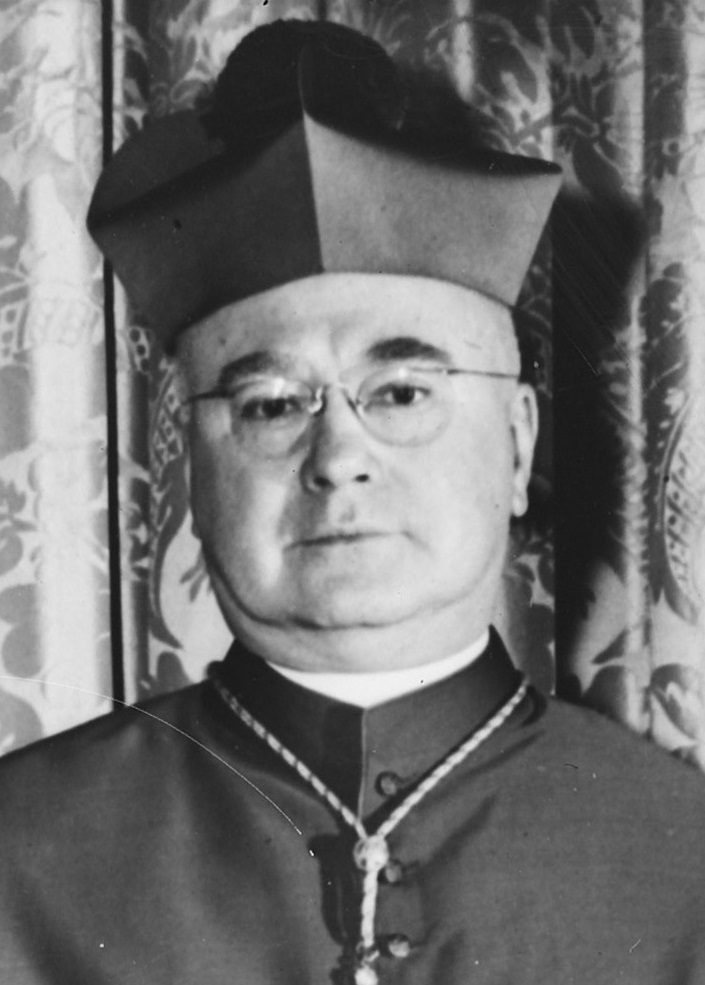
Francis Spellman was Archbishop of New York for 28 years, serving from 1939 until his death in 1967.
