= John Power (Vicar-General for New York) =

Irish-American Catholic priest (1792–1849)

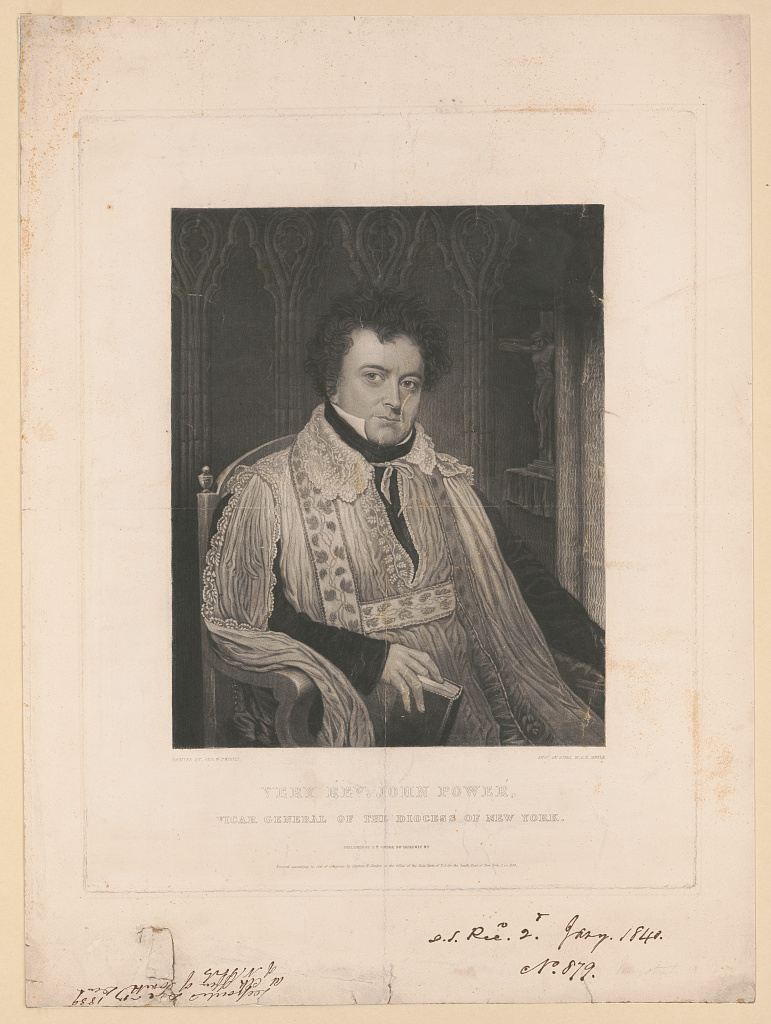
Very Rev. John Power, Vicar General of the diocese of New York

John Power (June 19, 1792 – 1849) was an Irish-born American Catholic priest who served as the pastor of St Peter's Roman Catholic Church in New York City as well as the Vicar General for the Diocese of New York. He administered the Catholic Diocese of New York during interregnum between the death of Bishop John Connelly and the appointment of Bishop John Dubois.

== Life ==
Power was born near Rosscarbery, County Cork, in the Kingdom of Ireland, in June 1792. He was educated in Cork and at St Patrick's College, Maynooth. Following his ordination, he served as a professor at the seminary in Cobh, and as curate at Youghal. After emigrating to the United States, in 1819 he was appointed as the pastor of St Peter's in New York and as the Vicar General of the diocese under Bishop John Connelly, O.P. St. James' Church in Brooklyn opened in 1823. Power was an early and stanch friend of the new congregation and used to cross the river frequently to minister to them.

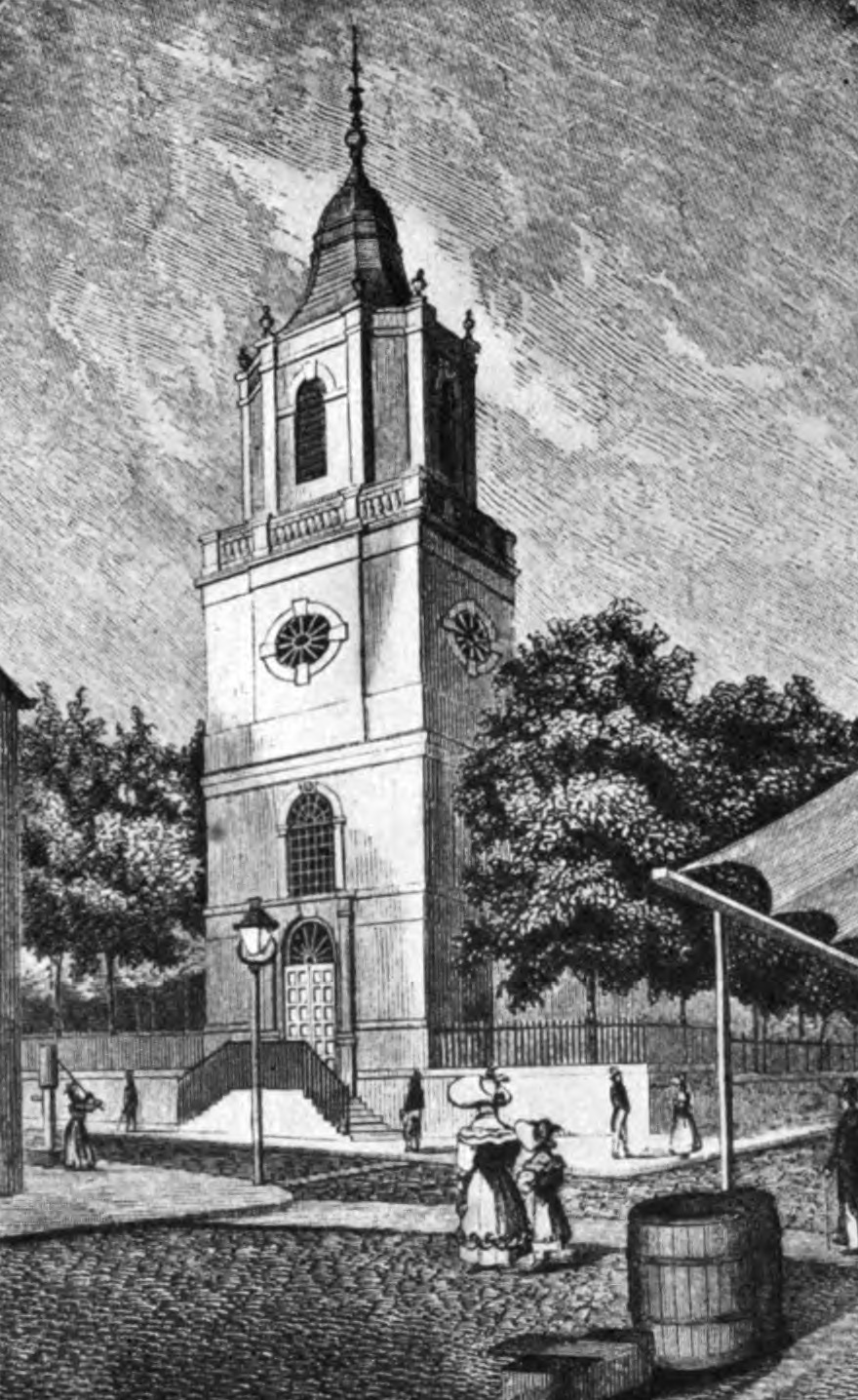
Old Saint Peter's Manhattan, New York

After Connelly died in 1825, Power took control of the diocese until the appointment of John Dubois, S.S., as bishop (November 1826). Power had been the popular choice for this position, and although he was capable and qualified, his youth was against him. In the summer of 1827, Irish immigrants working the Enfield Falls Canal at Windsor Locks, Connecticut, sent to New York for a priest to tend to one of their number who had fallen grievously ill. It was Monsignor Power who responded. Learning of the large number of Catholics in the area, he returned again in October. From there he went to New Haven, and having missed the boat for New York, stayed over and said Sunday Mass for a group of Catholics at a building on the Long Wharf. In 1829 he again found himself in charge of the diocese (with fellow cleric Felix Varela) when Dubois travelled to Europe to gather funding and support for his restructuring plans - a mission that lasted 2 years.

On Easter Monday, April 20, 1835, he laid cornerstone of St. Nicholas Kirche, dedicated to Saint Nicholas of Myra, the first national church for German-speaking Catholics. In 1837 the 73-year-old Dubois successfully petitioned for the appointment of a coadjutor bishop to assist him in his duties. Power, the popular choice was again overlooked, this time in favour of John Hughes, who had once been a pupil of Dubois.

During his time in New York, Power founded the Catholic newspaper the Truth Teller, was active in the Irish Emigrant Society, raised funds and championed the opening of an orphanage. He authored a manual of prayer (1832), and The New Testament: By Way of Question and Answer (1824). He also contributed to periodicals such as The United States Catholic Miscellany and The Truth Teller.

In later life Power suffered painful attacks of gout and became saddened by the burden of debt imposed on the Church by the rebuilding of St Peter's Church in 1837. He died on April 14, 1849, and was buried under the floor of what is now the Old Cathedral of St Patrick.

Power's brother, Dr. William Power, was a prominent member of the Irish-American community in New York. His sister, Anne, was the wife of New York property developer Thomas E. Davis. Another brother, Maurice Power, became a British member of parliament for County Cork and later the Lieutenant-Governor of St. Lucia.
