= Mary Agnes O'Connor =

Mother Mary Agnes O'Connor

Personal life
- Born: 6 January 1815 Kilkenny, Ireland
- Died: 20 December 1859 (aged 44) Convent of Mercy, New York city, United States

Religious life
- Religion: Christian
- Order: Sisters of Mercy

Mother Mary Agnes O'Connor (6 January 1815 – 20 December 1859) was an Irish Sisters of Mercy nun, foundress, and social worker.

== Life ==
Mary O'Connor was born in Kilkenny on 6 January 1815. She was the youngest of the ten children of Patrick and Mary O'Connor. On 27 April 1838, she entered the Convent of Mercy, Baggot Street, Dublin, receiving the habit of the Sisters of Mercy on 4 September 1838. She took the name Sister Mary Agnes and professed on 24 September 1840. She initially worked in the House of Mercy, a refuge for homeless women, as well as visiting the sick in their homes and in Sir Patrick Dun's and Mercer's hospitals.

O'Connor was sent to London on 31 July 1844, on a temporary basis to be the first superioress of St Edward's Convent, 32 Queen's Square, Bloomsbury. She resigned from this position on 27 January 1846, at the request of bishop Dr John Hughes, to found a Convent of Mercy in New York. She left with a group of nuns from Dublin on 13 April 1846, boarding the Montezuma in Liverpool, and arrived in New York on 14 May 1846. They began their work by visiting patients at Bellevue and Harlem hospitals, as well as inmates at the Tombs, Sing Sing, and Blackwell's Island penitentiary. A religious confraternity, the League of the Sacred Heart, was established in Sing Sing in 1848. The sisters went on to establish a Sunday school for adults, followed by a select academy opened on 15 June 1848, and a poor school on 21 January 1851. They also oversaw a circulating library, which had a wide readership.

A House of Mercy was established in 1848 to receive, educate and train immigrant Irish and local young women. In the early years, the majority of attendees were Irish women and girls. O'Connor would go to the docks to meet women as they arrived, and bring them to the House of Mercy which could house 100 women. The House had schoolrooms, dormitories and workrooms where the young women could learn reading, writing, and numeracy as well as dressmaking, embroidery, fine needlework, kitchen work, knitting, laundry work, and plain sewing. In its first 18 years, 9,054 young women attended at the House, with the nuns placing 16,869 persons into employment in the same period. The House also provided meals and other assistance to locals in poverty.

Further convents were established in Brooklyn on 12 September 1855, and in St Louis in June 1856 alongside Parochial and Sunday schools in the cities. O'Connor developed a painful eye condition from 1852, and was sent to Ireland to be seen by Sir William Wilde to no avail. She served as superior for 13 years until her death on 20 December 1859 in the Convent of Mercy, New York. She is buried in the crypt of the St. Patrick's Old Cathedral.
