= R. Luke Concanen =

American Catholic bishop

The Most Reverend Richard Luke Concanen O.P.
- Bishop of New York
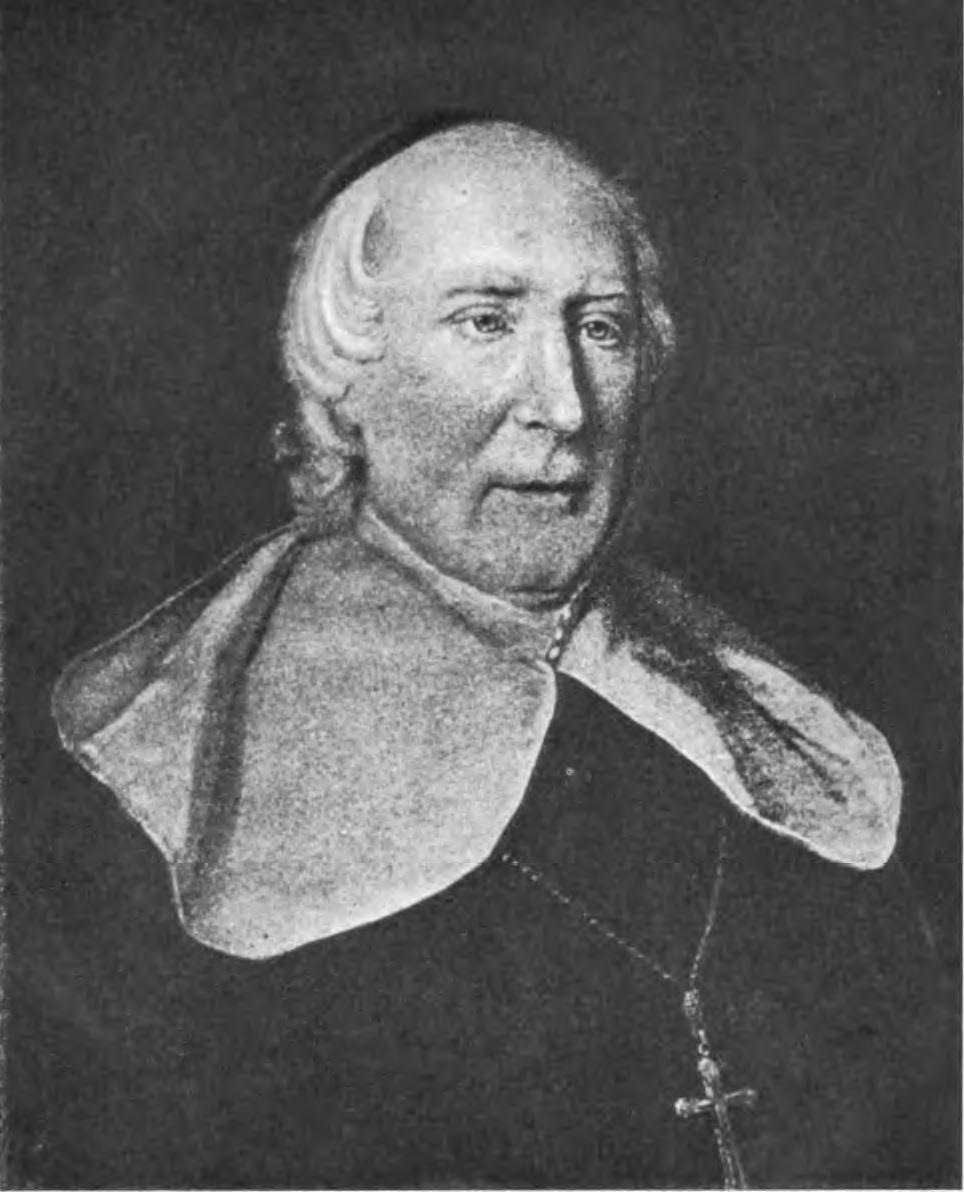
- Church: Catholic Church
- Province: Baltimore
- Diocese: New York
- Appointed: April 8, 1808
- Term ended: June 19, 1810
- Successor: John Connolly, O.P.

Orders
- Ordination: December 20, 1770
- Consecration: April 24, 1808 by Cardinal Michele di Pietro

Personal details
- Born: December 27, 1747 Kilbegnet, County Galway, Kingdom of Ireland
- Died: June 19, 1810 (aged 62) Naples, Kingdom of Naples
- Buried: Church of San Domenico Maggiore, Naples
- Denomination: Roman Catholic

Richard Luke Concanen, O.P. (December 27, 1747 – June 19, 1810) was an Irish-born Catholic prelate who served as the first Bishop of New York from 1808 to 1810. He was a member of the Dominicans.

== Biography ==
=== Early life ===
Richard Concanen was born on December 27, 1747, in Connaught in the Kingdom of Ireland to a wealthy family. He received an early education in Ireland, but Catholic schools were outlawed there. He was forced to travel to Italy at age 17 to continue his education.

Deciding to become a priest in the Dominican Order, Concanen probably entered the Irish Dominican College in Louvain, Belgium. He took his vows to the Dominicans in Louvain and assumed the name of Luke. The Dominicans then sent him to Rome to study philosophy at Dominican House of Studies, the predecessor to the Pontifical University of St. Thomas Aquinas.

After finishing his philosophy coursework in 1769, he began studying theology at San Clemente al Laterano, a convent for seminarians run by the Irish Dominicans. He studied under Reverend Thomas Troy, who later became archbishop of the Archdiocese of Dublin. Concanen was fluent in Italian, and also knew Irish, English, Latin, French, and German.

=== Priesthood ===
Concanen was ordained a priest in the Dominican Order by Patriarch François Mattei on December 22, 1770, at the Archbasilica of Saint John Lateran in Rome. He finished his theological studies in 1773, receiving the Dominican Lectorate of Sacred Theology.

After Concanen received his theology degree, the Dominicans assigned him as master of the Dominican novices at San Clemente in 1773. That same year, he joined the faculty at San Clemente and was named secretary of the convent council. By 1774, he had been named superior of San Clemente, and in 1775 he was its master of studies. However, feeling overloaded with these positions, Concaner resigned as master of studies the next year. Around this time, he was elected regent of the convent and in 1881 he was named its prior.

A gifted speaker with fluency in Italian, Concanen frequently preached in churches around Rome. He was appointed penitentiary-apostolic of the Basilica of Santa Maria Maggiore in Rome. In 1792/1793, he was named as theologian for the Biblioteca Casanatense, the Dominican library in Rome. He also served as an agent or secretary of the Irish Catholic bishops. He also assisted the English prelates and Bishop John Carroll in Baltimore, Maryland.

Pope Pius VI nominated Concanen as Bishop of Kilfenora and Apostolic Administrator of Kilmacduagh in 1798, but Concanen declined the appointment. In a letter to a friend, he explained:

Conscious of my inability for the awful Episcopal Charge, I have, from the very beginning, renounced my appointment...I am resolved to live and die in the obscure and retired way of life I have chosen from my youth.

In 1798, a French army under General Louis-Alexandre Berthier entered Rome, sent Pius VI into exile and ravaged both San Clemente and the Dominican House of Studies. During this period, Concanen served as administrator for the House of Studies. Deeply interested in the Catholic missions in the new United States, Concanen was instrumental in persuading the Dominicans in the early 19th century to send Reverend Edward Fenwick to set up a Dominican province in that nation. Concanen made large financial contributions to St. Rose Priory, established by Fenwick in Springfield, Kentucky, as the first Dominican priory in the United States. Concanen later bequeathed his personal library to St. Rose.

=== Bishop of New York ===
On April 8, 1808, Concanen was appointed the first bishop of the newly erected Diocese of New York by Pope Pius VII. As with his appointment as bishop of Kilfenora in 1798, Concanen tried to decline the appointment. At that time, he was in poor health. However, he quickly changed his mind. Concanen received his episcopal consecration in Rome on April 24, 1808, from Cardinal Michele di Pietro, with Archbishops Tommaso Arezzo and Benedetto Sinibaldi serving as co-consecrators.

Soon after his consecration, Concanen attempted to sail from Livorno, Italy, on an American ship to New York City. However, since that ship had also visited the United Kingdom, then at war with France, French authorities in Tuscany had stopped it from leaving port. He then considered traveling through France to a different port, but believed he was too weak to tolerate the long overland trip. Concanen also feared being arrested by the Napoleonic government in France and having papal documents confiscated. He remained in Livorno for four months trying to find another ship, then returned to Rome.

In July 1808, Concanen wrote to Carroll, asking him to appoint a vicar general to serve as Concanen's representative in New York; Carroll appointed Reverend Anthony Kohlman, a Jesuit priest, to fill the position in late 1809. Already working in New York, Kohlman had established the first St. Patrick's Cathedral in that city earlier that year.

In June 1810, having heard of an American ship with permission to sail from the Kingdom of Naples to Boston, Massachusetts, Concanen traveled to Naples. However, soon after arriving there, the Kingdom authorities, allied with the French, denied him permission to board the ship because he was an Irish national. Very disappointed, Concanen remarked to one of his companions, "Well, now I may say a farewell to America forever."

=== Death and legacy ===
Concanen died on June 19, 1810, in Naples at age 62, two days after being refused permission to sail. He was interred in the vault of the Dominican Church of San Domenico Maggiore in Naples.

On July 9, 1978, Cardinal Terence Cooke of New York, accompanied by Auxiliary Bishops Anthony F. Mestice and Patrick V. Ahern, traveled to Naples to attach a commemorative plaque to Concanen's tomb in the church.

Catholic Church titles
New title	Bishop of New York; 1808 – 1810	Succeeded by John Connolly
