= John Dubois =

French-American Catholic bishop (1764–1842)

The Most Reverend John Dubois
- Bishop of New York
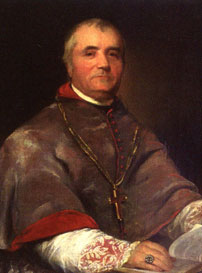
- Third Bishop of New York
- See: Diocese of New York
- Term ended: December 20, 1842
- Predecessor: John Connolly, O.P.
- Successor: John Hughes

Orders
- Ordination: September 28, 1787 by Antoine-Eléonore-Léon Le Clerc de Juigné
- Consecration: October 29, 1826 by Ambrose Maréchal, S.S.

Personal details
- Born: August 24, 1764 Paris, Kingdom of France
- Died: December 20, 1842 (aged 78) New York, New York, United States
- Buried: Old St. Patrick's Cathedral, New York, New York, United States
- Signature: John Dubois's signature

John Dubois (French: Jean Dubois) (August 24, 1764 – December 20, 1842) was a French-born Catholic prelate who served as Bishop of New York from 1826 until his death in 1842.

Dubois was the first Bishop of New York who was not Irish-born and, as of 2024, remains the only bishop or archbishop of New York of non-Irish ancestry.

== Biography ==
=== Early life ===
John Dubois was born in Paris, France, on August 24, 1764. As a teenager, he attended the Lycée Louis-le-Grand in Paris. Deciding to become a priest, he studied theology at the Oratorian Seminary of Saint-Magloire in Paris.

=== Priesthood in France ===
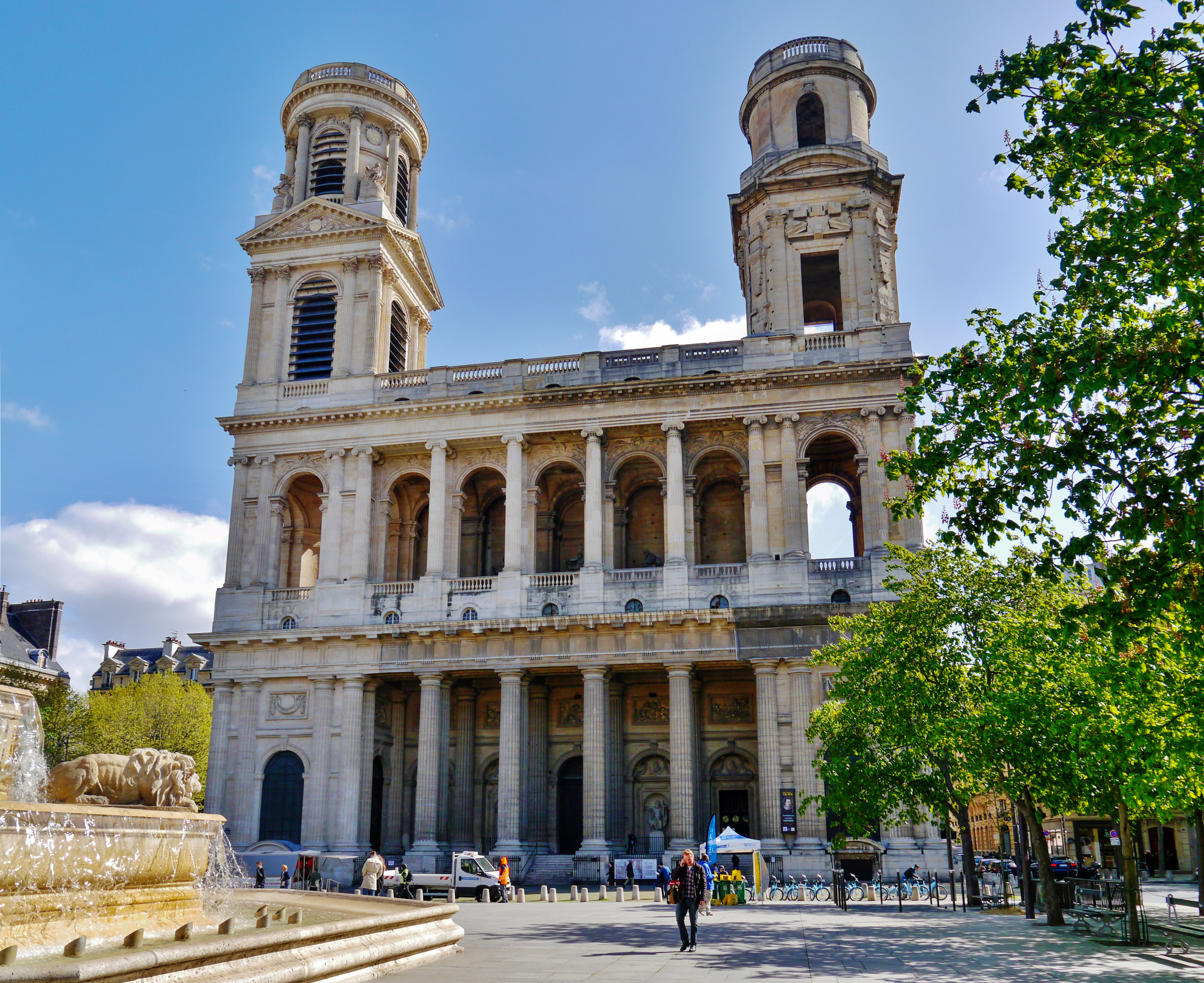
Saint-Sulpice Church, Paris, France

Dubois was ordained a priest for the Archdiocese of Paris on September 22, 1787, by Archbishop Antoine-Eléonore-Léon Le Clerc de Juigné. After his ordination, Dubois served as an assistant to the curé of the Church of Saint Sulpice in Paris. He also served chaplain to the Hôpital des Petites-Maisons (the Hospital of Small Houses), a mental hospital run by the Daughters of Charity of Saint Vincent de Paul.

By 1790, the French Revolution was causing huge upheaval in France. In November 1790, the National Constituent Assembly decreed that all clergy must swear an oath of loyalty to the government of France, ahead of loyalty to the pope. Failure to sign the oath mean loss of income, military conscription or death.

Many priests of the Order of Sulpice fled to England. In early 1791, Reverend Charles Nagot led a group of Sulpicians to Baltimore, Maryland. Dubois was able to flee France to America with the assistance Maximilien Robespierre, a leader of the revolution who had attended the Collège Louis LeGrand with Dubois.

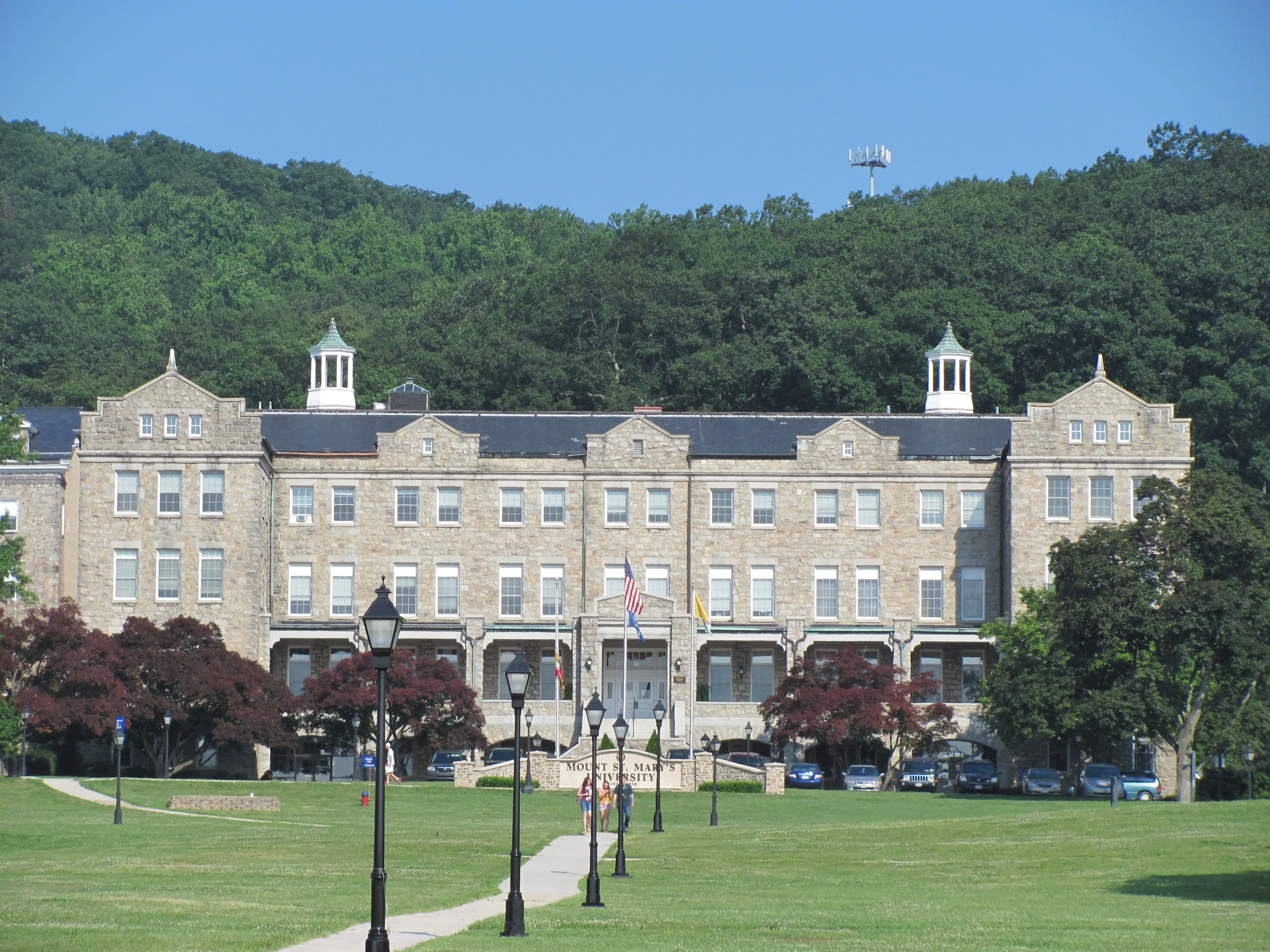
Present-day Mount St. Mary's University, Emmitsburg, Maryland

=== Priesthood in the United States ===
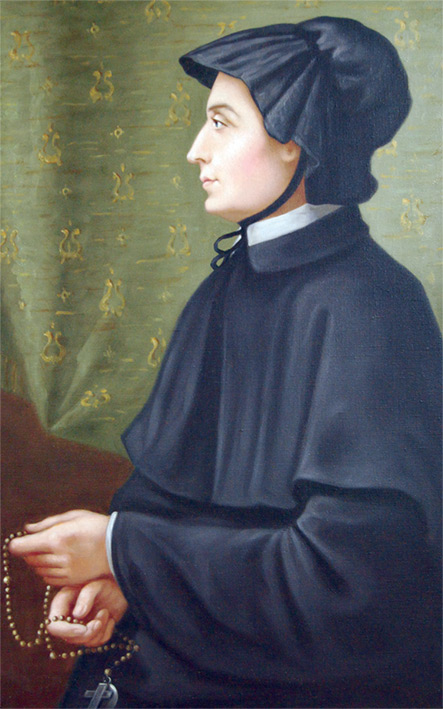
Mother Elizabeth Ann Seton

Dubois landed at Norfolk, Virginia in August, 1791, and traveled to Richmond, Virginia. He was carrying a letter of introduction from the Marquis de Lafayette, a French hero of the recently concluded American Revolution. Dubois was warmly received in Richmond by Colonel James Monroe, the legislator Patrick Henry and other prominent Richmond families. Henry helped Dubois learn English. The Richmond families hosted Dubois until he was able to rent a house in the city and open a school to teach French, the classics and arithmetic.

Virginia had disestablished the Episcopal Church as the official church by statute in 1786. That same law also guaranteed freedom of religion, releasing the Commonwealth's small Catholic population from civil restrictions. Dubois soon became friends with the Episcopalian John Buchanan and the Presbyterian John Blair two ministers who alternated holding religious services in the Virginia State Capitol. On one occasion, the Virginia General Assembly invited Dubois to celebrate mass in the Capitol courtroom. During his time in Richmond, Dubois celebrated masses in rented rooms or at the homes of the city's few Catholic families.

In 1788, the Vatican appointed Reverend John Carroll, the superior of the American mission, as bishop of the Diocese of Baltimore, the first Catholic diocese in the United States. In 1794, Carroll sent Dubois to Frederick, Maryland, to tend to the growing Catholic population in that region. He was also responsible for the church presence in the Shenandoah Valley of Virginia and the frontier regions westward to the Mississippi River. The Society of Jesus had previously supervised missions in these areas, but Pope Clement XIV had suppressed the order in 1773, forcing them to surrender all their holdings.

In May 15, 1800, Dubois consecrated the cornerstone of St. John the Evangelist Church in Frederick. For the next eleven years, Dubois served as pastor of St. John the Evangelist Church, making excursions into the frontier.

In 1808, Dubois founded Mount St. Mary's College in Emmitsburg, Maryland and became its first president. Later that same year, in November 1808, he joined the Sulpician Order. Mount St. Mary's trained many missionaries who were sent out west to build mission churches. In 1809, Dubois invited Elizabeth Bayley Seton, a recent widow and convert to move to Emmitsburg. That same year, she established the first religious institute of teaching sisters in the United States. In 1810, Seton established Saint Joseph's Academy and Free School in Emmitsburg, the first Catholic girls' school in the nation. Seton was canonized a saint in 1975.

In 1824, Dubois left the Sulpician Order. He continued as president of Mount St. Mary's until his appointment as bishop of New York.

=== Bishop of New York ===
On May 23, 1826, Pope Leo XII appointed Dubois as bishop of New York. The pope made this appointment on the recommendation of Reverend Anthony Kohlmann, who was pastor of St. Peter's Church, the first Catholic church in New York City. Dubois was consecrated at the Cathedral of the Assumption of the Blessed Virgin Mary in Baltimore by Archbishop Ambrose Maréchal on October 29, 1826.

The primarily Irish clergy in the Diocese of New York did not appreciate the appointment of a French bishop. Although Dubois had acquired an adequate command of English, he spoke with an accent; they viewed him as a "foreigner". Many of the clergy believed that Monsignor John Power, the Irish-American vicar general, should have become bishop. There were suspicions that Maréchal, also French-born, had influenced the pope to select Dubois. At one point, the trustees of St. Patrick's Old Cathedral in Manhattan, tangled in a dispute with Dubois over the ownership of church property, withheld their contributions of food and shelter from him.

In 1837, Dubois traveled to Salina, New York to marry Silas Titus and Eliza McCarthy. The marriage certificate became the first record of a Catholic service in Onondaga County. Reverend John McCloskey, a future archbishop of New York, accompanied Dubois to Salina as a guide. In 1837, Dubois requested that the pope appoint a coadjutor bishop to assist him.

During his tenure as bishop, Dubois erected six new parishes in New York City. He also commissioned Reverend Phillip O’Reilly to serve the "Congregation of the Hudson" north of Manhattan. Dubois ordered that the diocesan pastors direct all church collections on Christmas Day to the care of orphans. In 1838, he extended this edict to include the Easter collection.

=== Death and legacy ===
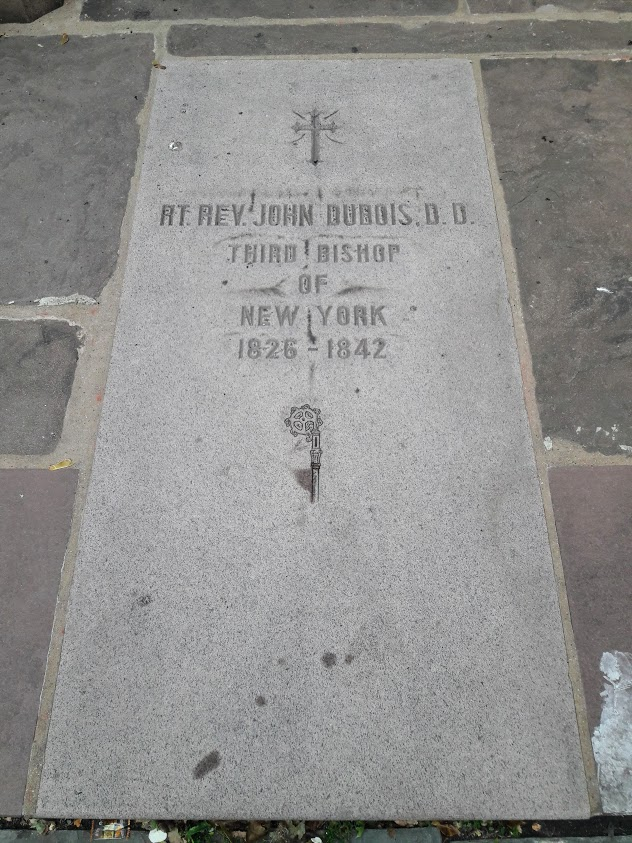
Bishop Dubois' grave, Old St. Patrick's Cathedral, New York City

Dubois died on December 20, 1842, in New York City. He is buried under the sidewalk at the entrance to the Old St Patrick's Cathedral. He requested this spot so that people could "walk on me in death, as they wished to in life". A plaque at the church's entrance memorializes Dubois.

Catholic Church titles
| Preceded by John Connolly, O.P. | Bishop of New York; 1826 – 1842 | Succeeded by John Hughes |
