= John Hughes (archbishop of New York) =

American archbishop (1797–1864)

The Most Reverend John Hughes
- Archbishop of New York
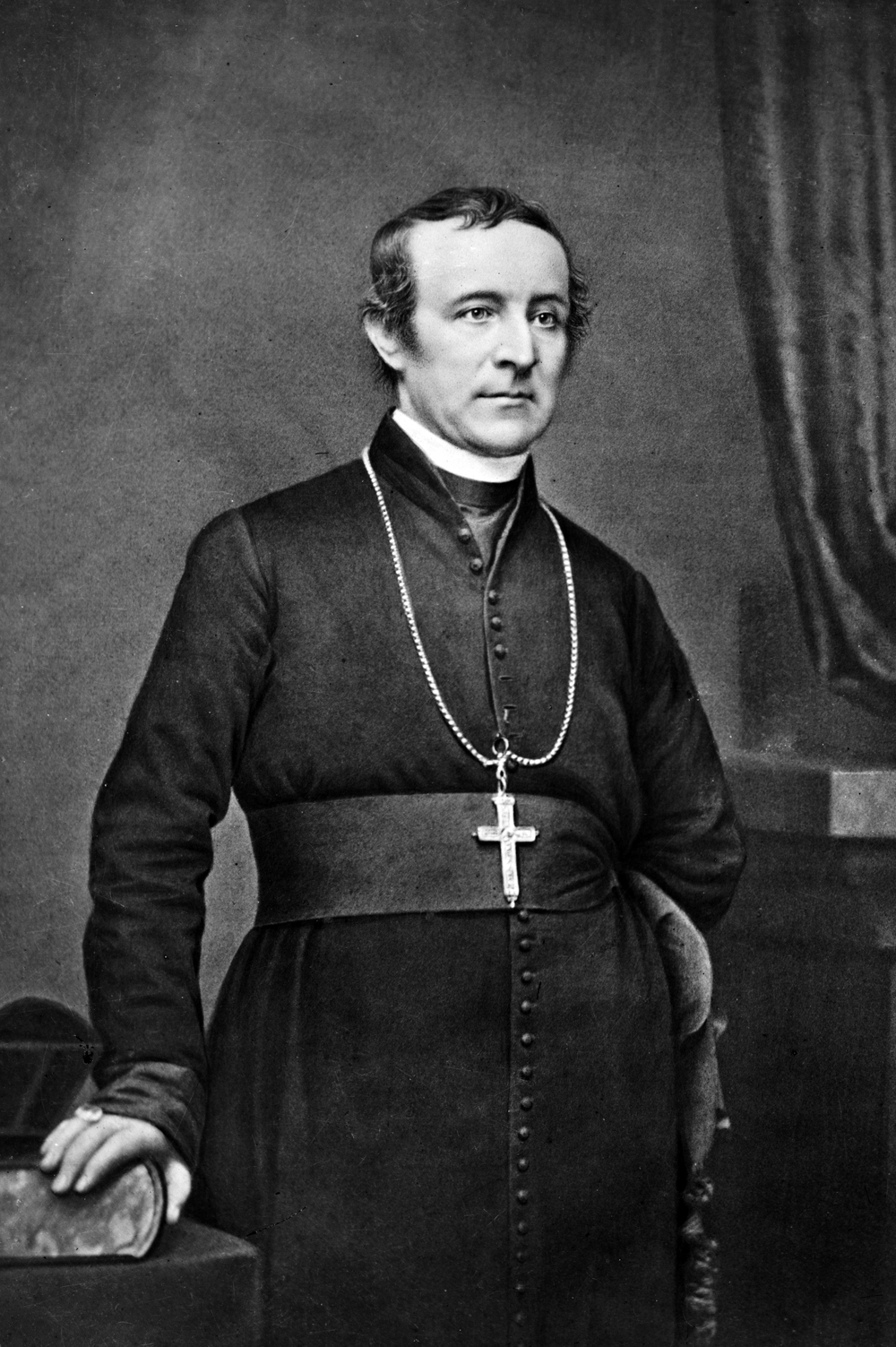
- Photo by Mathew Brady, c. 1860–1863
- See: New York
- Installed: December 20, 1842
- Term ended: January 3, 1864
- Predecessor: John Dubois
- Successor: John McCloskey
- Other posts: Coadjutor Bishop of the Diocese of New York and Titular Bishop of Basilinopolis (1838–1842); Priest of the Diocese of Philadelphia (1826–1838)

Orders
- Ordination: October 15, 1826 by Henry Conwell
- Consecration: January 7, 1838 by John Dubois

Personal details
- Born: June 24, 1797 Annaloghan, County Tyrone, Ireland
- Died: January 3, 1864 (aged 66) New York City, US
- Denomination: Roman Catholic Church
- Education: Mount St. Mary's Seminary

John Joseph Hughes (June 24, 1797 – January 3, 1864) was an Irish-born Catholic prelate who served as bishop (and later archbishop) of New York from 1842 until his death. In 1841, he founded St. John's College, which would later become Fordham University.

A native of Ireland, Hughes was born and raised in Augher in the south of County Tyrone. He emigrated to the United States in 1817, and became a priest in 1826 and a bishop in 1838. A figure of national prominence, he exercised great moral and social influence, and presided over a period of explosive growth for Catholicism in New York. He was regarded as "the best known, if not exactly the best loved, Catholic bishop in the country." He became known as "Dagger John", both for his following the Catholic practice wherein a bishop precedes his signature with a cross, as well as for his aggressive personality. His sister Angela Hughes was a nun and oversaw the opening of 15 schools and convents in New York.

== Early life ==
Hughes was born in the hamlet of Annaloghan, near Augher, in County Tyrone, part of the Province of Ulster in the north of Ireland. He was the third of seven children of Patrick and Margaret (née McKenna) Hughes who were from Errigal Truagh, County Monaghan. In reference to the anti-Catholic penal laws of Ireland, he later observed that, prior to his baptism, he had lived the first five days of his life on terms of "social and civil equality with the most favored subjects of the British Empire." He and his family suffered religious persecution in their native land; his late sister was denied a Catholic burial conducted by a priest, and Hughes himself was nearly attacked by a group of Orangemen when he was about 15. He was sent with his elder brothers to a day school in the nearby village of Augher, and afterwards attended a grammar school in Aughnacloy.

Patrick Hughes, a poor but respectable tenant farmer, was forced to withdraw John from school and sent him to work one of his farms. However, being disinclined to farm life, he was placed as an apprentice to Roger Toland, the gardener at Favour Royal Manor, to study horticulture. His family emigrated to the United States in 1816 and settled in Chambersburg, Pennsylvania. Hughes joined them there the following year. He made several unsuccessful applications to Mount St. Mary's College in Emmitsburg, Maryland, where he was eventually hired by its Rector, the Abbé John Dubois, S.S., as a gardener. During this time he befriended Mother Elizabeth Ann Seton, who was favorably impressed by Hughes and persuaded Dubois to reconsider his admission. Hughes was subsequently admitted as a regular student of Mount St. Mary's in September 1820. In addition to his studies, he continued to supervise the garden, and served as a tutor in Latin and mathematics as well as prefect over the other students.

At that time, the president of Mount St. Mary's was the brilliant Simon Bruté, who also lectured on Sacred Scripture and taught Theology and Moral Philosophy. (Bruté would later become the first bishop of the Diocese of Vincennes, Indiana.) Hughes would on numerous occasions consult with his former teacher for advice long after he had left Emmitsburg.

== Priesthood ==
As a seminarian, Hughes resolved to serve his home Diocese of Philadelphia, then governed by Bishop Henry Conwell. The bishop, while performing a canonical visitation of his diocese, met Hughes at his parents' home in Chambersburg and invited him to accompany him on the remainder of his visitation. On October 15, 1826, Hughes was ordained to the priesthood by Bishop Conwell at Old St. Joseph's Church in Philadelphia.

Hughes' first assignment was as a curate at St. Augustine's Church in Philadelphia, where he assisted its pastor, the Rev. Father Michael Hurley, O.E.S.A., by celebrating Mass, hearing confessions, preaching sermons, and other duties in the parish. Later that year he was sent to serve as a missionary in Bedford, where he secured the conversions of several Protestants. In January 1827, he was recalled to Philadelphia and named pastor of St. Joseph's Church. He labored afterwards at St. Mary's Church, whose trustees were in open revolt against the bishop, and were subdued by Hughes only when he built St. John the Evangelist Church in 1832, then considered one of the finest in the country. Previous to this, in 1829, he founded St. John's Orphan Asylum.

About this time Hughes became engaged in a public controversy over Catholic beliefs with the Rev. John A. Breckinridge, a distinguished Presbyterian clergyman and son of the former Attorney General in the Jefferson Administration. Several debates ensued between the two concerning whether Catholicism was compatible with American republicanism and liberty. Though it was predicted that the Irish immigrant would be outclassed by his better educated Protestant adversary, Hughes acquitted himself very well against his opponent's attacks on his religion. The debates resulted in the pugnacious Hughes' emergence as a vigorous defender of Catholicism in America. His name was mentioned for the vacant see of Cincinnati and as a coadjutor for Philadelphia.

== Episcopacy ==
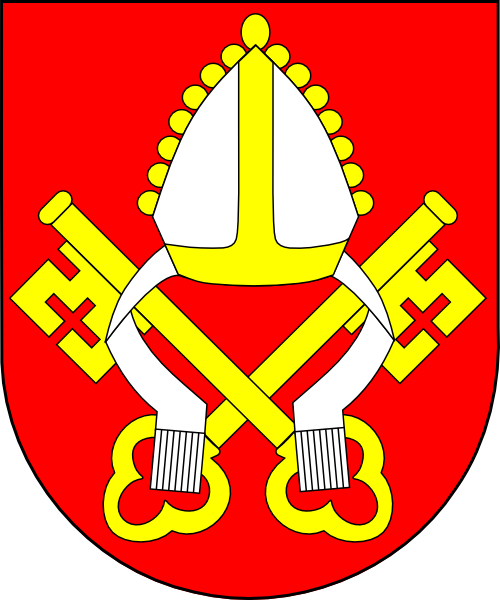
The episcopal coat of arms of Archbishop John J. Hughes

=== Coadjutor bishop ===
Hughes was chosen by Pope Gregory XVI as the coadjutor bishop of the Diocese of New York on August 7, 1837. He was consecrated bishop at St. Patrick's Old Cathedral on January 7, 1838, with the title of the titular see of Basilinopolis, by the Bishop of New York, John Dubois, S.S., his former Rector. Although wishing Hughes no ill, many of the priests in the diocese had favored the popular Rev John Power, Vicar-General. Power had been overlooked for the position in 1826 when Dubois won the appointment as bishop. The clergy demonstrated their disappointment by not attending the consecration.

=== Trusteeism ===
One challenge Hughes took on upon arriving in New York was the dispute between the trustees of various parishes in the city, who held the control of these institutions. This practice was known as trusteeism, and the bishop challenged both the practicality and the legitimacy of it. Hughes drew upon his experience with this situation in Philadelphia and was able to get a referendum passed by the Catholics of the city in 1841 supporting the authority of the bishop.

=== Education ===
In 1840-1842 Hughes led a political battle to secure funding for the Catholic schools. He rallied support from both the Tammany Hall Democrats, and from the opposition Whig Party, whose leaders, especially Governor William H. Seward, supported Hughes. He argued Catholics paid double for schools—they paid taxes to subsidize private schools they could not use and also paid for the parochial schools they did use. Catholics could not use Public School Society schools because they forced students to listen to readings from the Protestant King James Bible which they believed undermined their Catholic faith. With the Maclay Act in 1842, the New York State legislature established the New York City Board of Education. It gave the city an elective Board of Education empowered to build and supervise schools and distribute the education fund. It provided that no money should go to the schools that taught religion, so Hughes lost his battle. He turned inward: he founded an independent Catholic school system in the city. His new system included the first Catholic college in the Northeast, St. John's College, now Fordham University. By 1870 19 percent of the city's children were attending Catholic schools.

=== Bishop of New York ===
Hughes was appointed Apostolic Administrator of the diocese the following year, due to Dubois' failing health. As coadjutor, he automatically succeeded Dubois upon the bishop's death on December 20, 1842. He took over a diocese which covered the entire State of New York and northern New Jersey, having only some 40 priests to serve a Catholic population estimated to be about 200,000 at the time.

In 1844 anti-Catholic riots instigated by Nativist agitators threatened to spread to New York from Philadelphia, where two churches had been burned and twelve people had died. Hughes put armed guards at Catholic churches and, after learning a Nativist rally was scheduled to take place in New York, famously told the Nativist sympathizing mayor that "if a single Catholic Church were burned in New York, the city would become a second Moscow" – a reference to the Fire of Moscow. City leaders took him at his word, and the anti-Catholic faction was not allowed to conduct its rally.

Hughes founded the Ultramontane newspaper the New York Freeman to express his ideas. In 1850 he delivered an address entitled "The Decline of Protestantism and Its Causes," in which he announced as the ambition of Catholicism "to convert all Pagan nations, and all Protestant nations. ... Our mission [is] to convert the world –including the inhabitants of the United States – the people of the cities, and the people of the country, ... the Legislatures, the Senate, the Cabinet, the President, and all!"

Hughes held a "strong commitment to the cause of Irish freedom" but also felt that immigrants, particularly his fellow Irish immigrants, "should demonstrate their unswerving loyalty to their adopted land."

=== Archbishop ===
Hughes became an archbishop on July 19, 1850, when the diocese was elevated to the status of archdiocese by Pope Pius IX. As archbishop, Hughes became the metropolitan for the Catholic bishops serving all the dioceses established in the entire Northeastern United States. He convened the first meeting of the Ecclesiastical Province of New York in September 1854. After this he traveled to Rome, where he was present at the proclamation of the Immaculate Conception as a dogma of the Catholic Church by Pope Pius. Hughes served as President Lincoln's semiofficial envoy to the Vatican and to France in later 1861 and early 1862. Lincoln also sought Hughes' advice on the appointment of hospital chaplains. On 3 September 1855, Archbishop Hughes traveled to St. John's, Newfoundland for the consecration of the new Roman Catholic Cathedral.

In an address in March 1852, Hughes lionized what he referred to as the "spirit of the constitution," expressed hope that the "parties" of the republic would be completely "penetrated" by that spirit, and stated that the founders' achievements in the realm of religious freedom were "original" in history and that the constitution's "negation of all power to legislate" on "rights of conscience" made American law on that topic superior to that of other countries which had secured these rights "by some positive statute." In the same address, Hughes also expressed sentiments of religious toleration, stating that "we are indebted" to the "liberality of Protestantism," in light of the fact that the framers of the Constitution "were almost, if not altogether, exclusively Protestants." He averred that the strong leadership of Washington and the variety of opposing Protestant views were likely more influential to the framers' stance on religious freedom than was Protestantism itself.

Hughes also stated that "the great men who framed the Constitution saw, with keen and delicate perception, that the right to tolerate implied the equal right to refuse toleration, and on behalf of the United States, as a civil government, they denied all right to legislate in the premises, one way or the other." He affirmed the role of Catholic soldiers in American wars and declared, "I think I shall be safe in saying that there has not been one important campaign or engagement in which Catholics have not bivouacked, fought, and fallen by the side of Protestants, in maintaining the rights and honor of their common country." Hughes also said that "It is... out of place, and altogether untrue, to assert or assume that this is a Protestant country or a Catholic country. It is neither. It is a land of religious freedom and equality; and I hope that, in this respect, it shall remain just what it now is to the latest posterity" and also that "Catholics, as such, are by no means strangers and foreigners in this land.... The Catholics have been here from the earliest dawn of the morning."

=== Slavery and John Mitchel ===
While Hughes did not endorse slavery, he suggested that the conditions of the "starving laborers" in the Northern states were often worse than that of those held in bondage in the South. He believed the Abolitionist movement veered towards ideological excess. In 1842 Hughes had cautioned his flock against signing Daniel O'Connell's abolitionist petition ("An Address of the People of Ireland to their Countrymen and Countrywomen in America") which he regarded as unnecessarily provocative.

Against what he saw as the Protestant republican agenda promoted by the Young Irelander exile John Mitchel and his journal the Citizen, Hughes, nonetheless, took a stand on the issue. Mitchel had been uncompromising in defense of slavery, denying it was a crime "or even a peccadillo to hold slaves, to buy slaves, to keep slaves to their work by flogging or other needful correction." He himself might wish for "a good plantation well-stocked with healthy negroes in Alabama." At Mitchel saw it, Hughes copied the abolition press "to cast an Alabama plantation" in his "teeth."

== Death ==
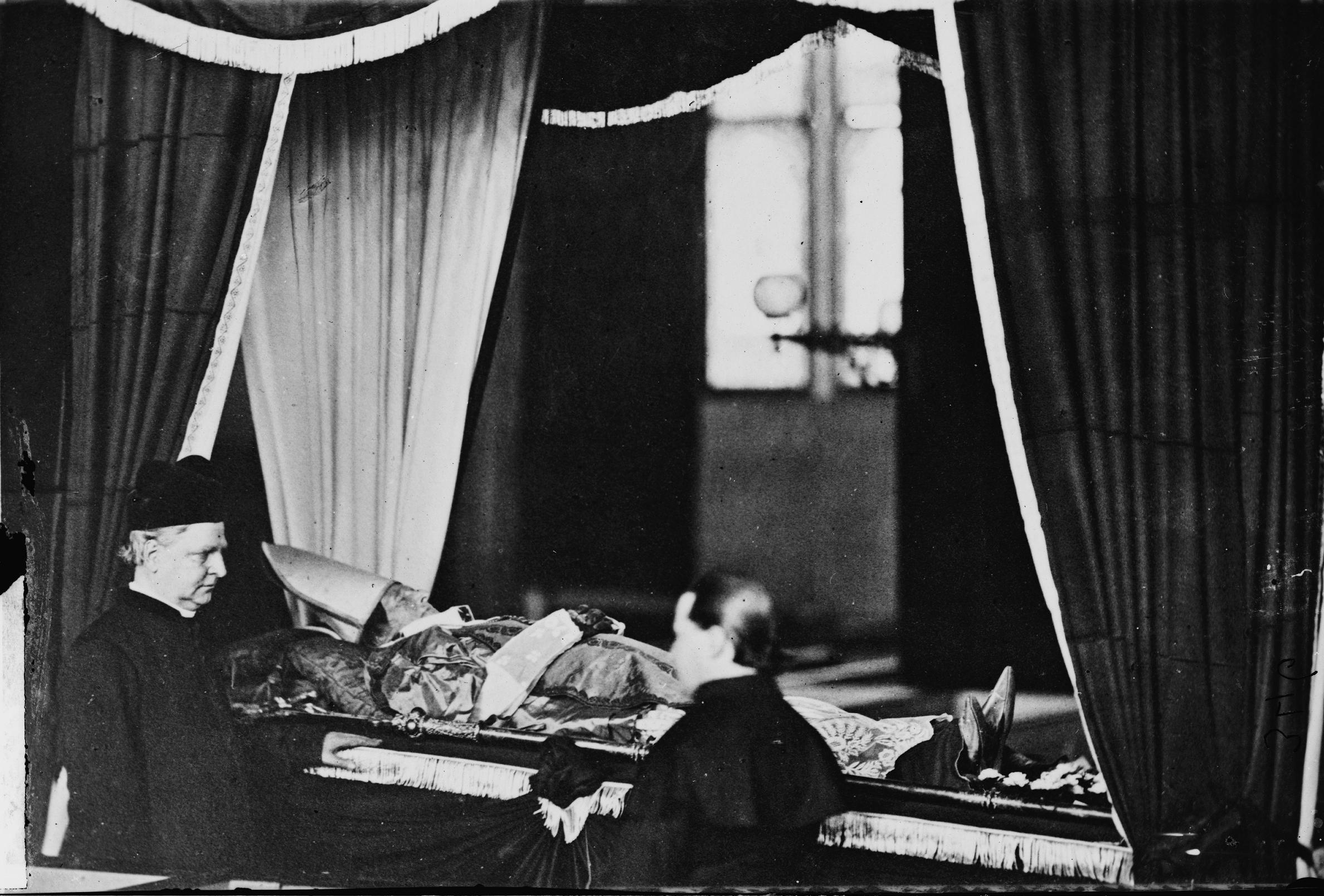
Archbishop Hughes, prepared for burial

Hughes served as archbishop until his death in 1864. He was originally buried in the old St. Patrick's Cathedral, but his remains were exhumed in 1882 and reinterred in the crypt under the altar of the new St. Patrick's Cathedral which he had undertaken to build.

== Character ==
Monsignor Thomas Shelley in his study on Hughes described him as a very "complex character," with one side that was "impetuous and authoritarian, a poor administrator and worse financial manager, indifferent to the non-Irish members of his flock, and prone to invent reality when it suited the purposes of his rhetoric." But Shelley finds this did not detract from the effectiveness of Hughes, who established 61 new parishes along with many other institutions.

Historian Daniel Walker Howe writes that Hughes "labored to bring a largely working-class Irish community into a meaningful relationship with Catholic Christianity" while at the same time working "to conciliate middle-class Catholics and Protestant well-wishers whose financial support he needed for his amazingly ambitious program of building." Howe continues, "Although no theologian, John Hughes ranks high for political judgment and in the significance of his accomplishments among nineteenth century American statesmen, civil as well as ecclesiastical. He successfully coped with fierce party competition in New York, bitter battles over the public school system, revolutions in Europe, the rise of nativism across the United States, and soaring rates of immigration after the Great Famine of Ireland. He encouraged his people to hard work, personal discipline, and upward social mobility." "Crucially, he combined his staunch American patriotism with staunch devotion to a nineteenth-century papacy deeply suspicious of all liberalism, especially American." Hughes "succeeded in fostering a strong Irish American identity, one centered on the Catholic faith rather than on the secular radicalism of the Irish nationalists who competed with him for community leadership." This achievement, however, came "at the cost of losing to the Irish-American community the Irish Protestant immigrants."

According to his later successor, Patrick Cardinal Hayes, named archbishop of New York in 1919, Archbishop Hughes was severe of manner, and kindly of heart, but was not aggressive until assailed.

== Legacy ==
In New York, Hughes founded St. John's College (now Fordham University) and, under his administration, invited many religious congregations to staff and administrate schools in New York, among them members of the Society of Jesus (to whom he entrusted the care of St. John's), who also established Fordham Preparatory School and Xavier High School; the Brothers of the Christian Schools who founded Manhattan College; and he established as an autonomous congregation the Sisters of Charity of New York, in which his sister Angela was a member, who founded the Academy of Mount St. Vincent (now College of Mount Saint Vincent). All of these institutions remain active to this day.

"Hughes Hall," the first purpose-built home of Fordham Prep, was named for the archbishop in 1935. The building currently houses Fordham University's Gabelli School of Business on its Rose Hill campus. There is also a dining space with restaurants on the Rose Hill campus named "Dagger John's" in honor of Hughes. A street near Fordham University is named in his honor (Hughes Avenue). In addition, each year, Fordham recognizes a graduating senior who has demonstrated achievement in the study of philosophy with an award named in honor of Hughes.

To the dismay of many in New York's Protestant upper class, Hughes foresaw the uptown expansion of the city and began construction of the current St. Patrick's Cathedral on Fifth Avenue between 50th and 51st Street, laying its cornerstone on August 15, 1858. It was not completed until after his death. At the time, due to its remote location in a still-rural part of Manhattan, the new cathedral was initially dubbed "Hughes' Folly" by the press for many years. Ultimately, Hughes's foresight proved providential, as the rapid urban growth uptown would soon place the new cathedral in the emerging urban center of midtown Manhattan.

== See also ==
- History of education in New York City#The Catholic issue

Catholic Church titles
Archdiocese Erected	Archbishop of New York; 1850 – 1864	Succeeded by John McCloskey
Preceded by John Dubois, S.S.	Bishop of New York; 1842 – 1850	Elevated to Archdiocese
Preceded by –	Coadjutor Bishop of New York; 1838 – 1842	Succeeded by –
