= John Connolly (bishop) =

Irish-American Catholic bishop (1750–1825)

His Excellency John Connolly OP
- Bishop of New York
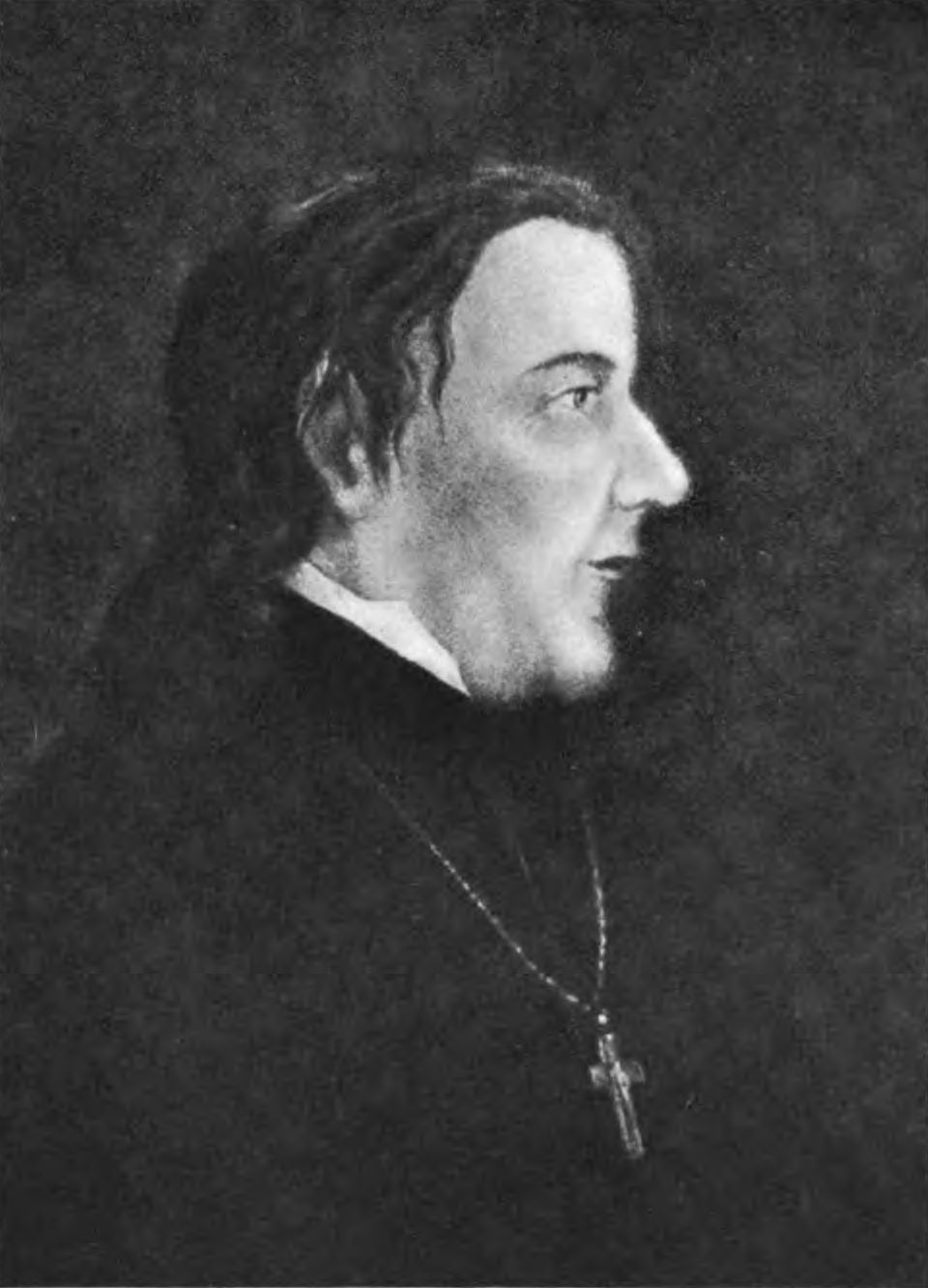
- Province: Baltimore
- See: New York
- Appointed: October 4, 1814
- Installed: November 1815
- Term ended: February 6, 1825
- Predecessor: Richard Luke Concanen, O.P.
- Successor: John Dubois, S.S.

Orders
- Ordination: September 24, 1774
- Consecration: November 6, 1814 by Cardinal Cesare Brancadoro

Personal details
- Born: 1750 County Meath, Kingdom of Ireland
- Died: February 6, 1825 (aged 74) New York, New York, United States
- Buried: St. Patrick's Old Cathedral, New York, New York, United States
- Denomination: Roman Catholic

John Connolly, O.P. (1750 – February 6, 1825), was an Irish-born Catholic prelate who served as Bishop of New York from 1814 until his death. He was a member of the Dominicans.

== Biography ==
=== Early life ===
John Connolly was born in County Meath, Ireland; according to various sources, he was born in either Slane or Drogheda. Dominican historian Victor O'Daniel reports that Connolly's family had a tenant farm on the Hill of Slane. After receiving his early education in his native country, he continued his studies in Belgium, and entered the Order of Friars Preachers, more commonly known as the Dominican friars, at an early age. He was subsequently sent to Rome, where he was ordained to the priesthood on September 24, 1774. Among the various capacities he filled in Rome, Connolly served as a professor at the Dominican convent of St. Clement, of which institution he later became prior. He was also an agent of the Irish bishops, and saved the English and Irish colleges—as well as his own convent, church, and library—from being plundered by the French invaders.

=== Bishop of New York ===
On October 4, 1814, Connolly was appointed the second Bishop of New York in the United States by Pope Pius VII. He received his episcopal consecration on the following November 6 from Cardinal Cesare Brancadoro, with Archbishops Giovanni Francesco Guerrieri and Giovanni Marchetti serving as co-consecrators, in Rome.

Connolly set sail from Italy and stopped in Ireland on the way. At St. Kieran's College in Kilkenny, he attempted to recruit priests for his new diocese. He did not reach New York until November 24, 1815. He arrived on board the Sally from a transatlantic trip that took all of sixty-seven days, and Connolly had been presumed lost at sea.

Since the first Bishop of New York, R. Luke Concanen, O.P., had been impeded from sailing for New York due to the embargo of Europe then in place, Connolly was the first bishop of the diocese to minister personally to his flock. He is described as having been a "small-sized man" and a person of more than ordinary mildness and gentleness of character, who would travel the city on foot to attend to the poor and sick.

According to historian Peter Guilday, "It may well be doubted if, in the entire history of the Catholic Church in the United States, any other bishop began his episcopal life under such disheartening conditions." At the time of Connolly's arrival, the diocese covered all of New York and part of New Jersey, with four priests, three churches, and approximately 15,000 Catholics, most of them Irish, along with some English, French and Germans. There were three churches: St. Peter's on Barclay Street, St. Patrick's on Mulberry St., and St. Mary's in Albany. During his tenure, he erected churches in Utica and Rochester, founded an orphanage, and introduced the Sisters of Charity. He traveled over 1,000 miles on horseback, preaching and bringing the sacraments to half-starved immigrants, largely from Ireland, who were building the Erie Canal.

Connolly died on February 6, 1825, at age 74. He is interred at St. Patrick's Old Cathedral He body was later displaced to a vault by the trustees to make way for that of an influential layman. It was not rediscovered until the building was renovated in 1976. Terence Cardinal Cooke had it reinterred in St. Patrick's Old Cathedral.

Catholic Church titles
Preceded by R. Luke Concanen	Bishop of New York; 1814 – 1825	Succeeded by John Dubois
