= St. Patrick's Old Cathedral =

Catholic parish church in Manhattan, New York

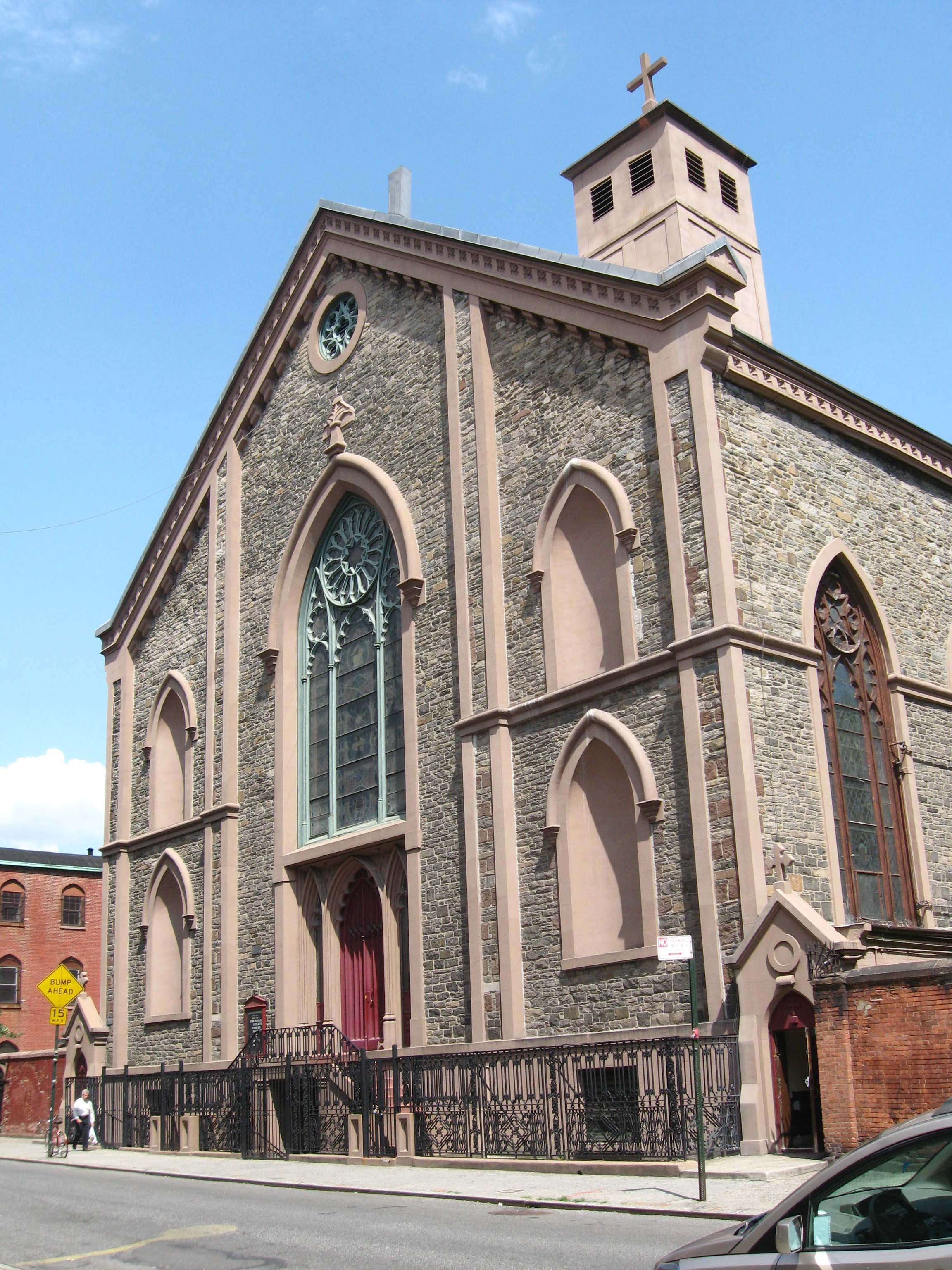
- Mulberry Street facade
- St. Patrick's Old Cathedral
- 40°43′25″N 73°59′43″W
- Location: Mulberry Street, Manhattan, New York City
- Country: United States
- Denomination: Catholic Church
- Tradition: Latin Church
- Website: St. Patrick's Old Cathedral

History
- Status: Minor basilica, former cathedral
- Dedication: May 14, 1815

Architecture
- Architect: Joseph-François Mangin
- Style: Gothic Revival
- Groundbreaking: 1809
- Completed: 1815

Administration
- Archdiocese: Archdiocese of New York
- Deanery: South Manhattan
- Old St. Patrick's Cathedral Complex
- U.S. National Register of Historic Places
- U.S. Historic district
- U.S. Historic district – Contributing property
- New York State Register of Historic Places
- New York City Landmark
- Area: 1.8 acres (0.73 ha)
- Part of: Chinatown and Little Italy Historic District (ID10000012)
- NRHP reference No.: 77000964
- NYSRHP No.: 06101.000076
- NYCL No.: 0187

Significant dates
- Added to NRHP: August 29, 1977
- Designated CP: February 12, 2010
- Designated NYSRHP: June 23, 1980
- Designated NYCL: June 21, 1966

The Basilica of Saint Patrick's Old Cathedral (sometimes shortened to St. Patrick's Old Cathedral or simply Old St. Patrick's) is a Catholic parish church, basilica, and former cathedral of the Archdiocese of New York, located in the Nolita neighborhood of Lower Manhattan, New York City. Built between 1809 and 1815 and designed by Joseph-François Mangin in the Gothic Revival style, it was the seat of the archdiocese until the current St. Patrick's Cathedral in Midtown Manhattan opened in 1879. Currently, liturgies are celebrated in English, Italian, Spanish, and Chinese. The church is at 260–264 Mulberry Street between Prince and Houston streets, with the primary entrance on Mott Street. Old St. Patrick parish merged with Most Precious Blood parish, and the two churches share priests and administrative staff.

The Old St. Patrick's church building was designated a New York City landmark in 1966, and the cathedral complex was added to the National Register of Historic Places in 1977. It was declared a minor basilica by Pope Benedict XVI on Saint Patrick's Day, March 17, 2010.

== History ==
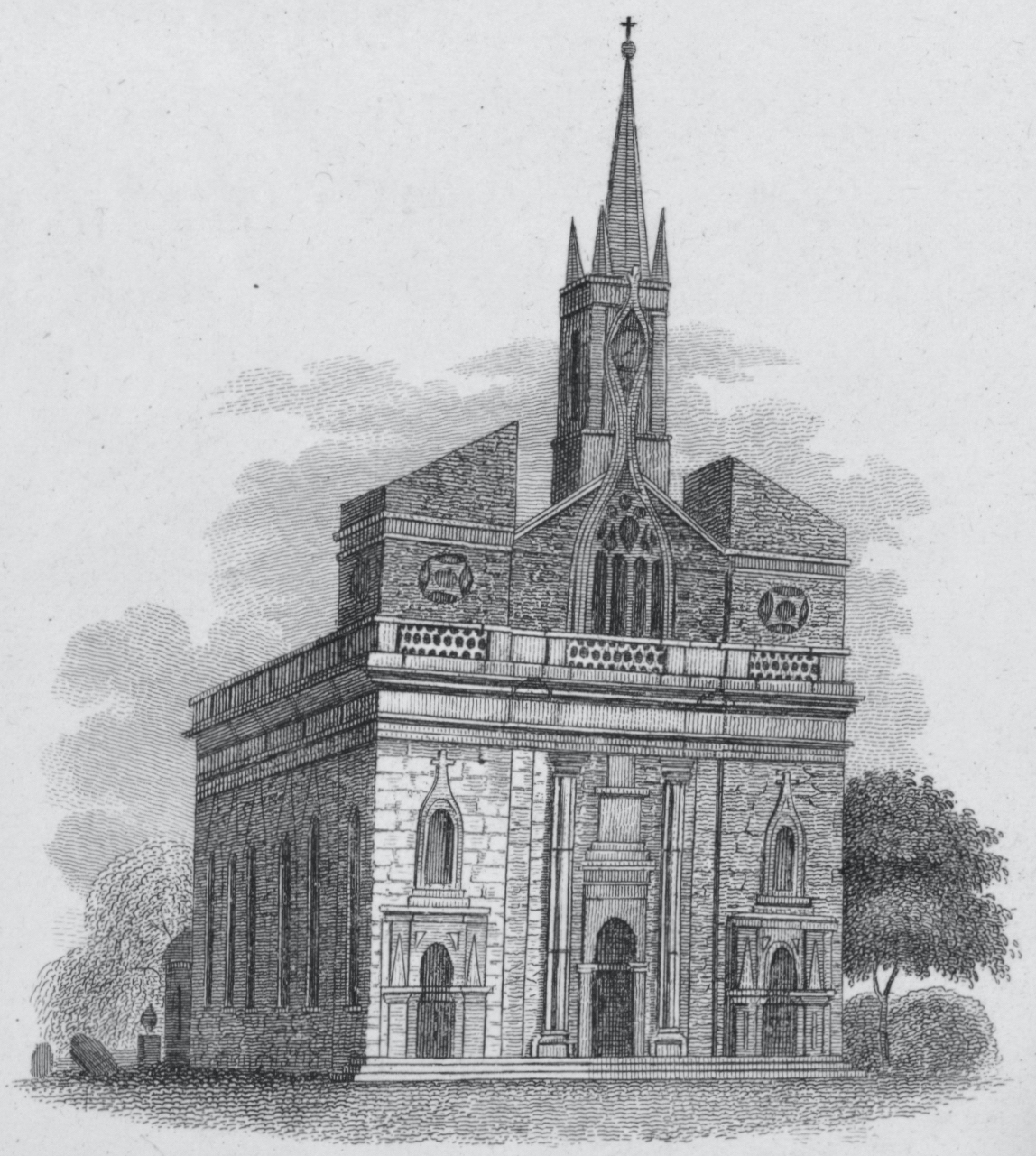
St. Patrick's Cathedral before the reconstruction of 1840

The first Catholic parish church in New York City was St. Peter's on Barclay Street, the cornerstone of which was laid in 1785. By the early 19th century, Anthony Kohlmann, the Jesuit rector of that church, realized that the city's growing Catholic population needed both a second sanctuary and a cathedral for the first bishop, since the city had been made a see in 1808. The site he selected for the new church was being used as a cemetery for St. Peter's, and was well outside the settled area of the city, surrounded by farmland and the country houses of the rich. The architect chosen was Joseph-Francois Mangin, who had co-designed New York's City Hall with John McComb Jr., construction on which was ongoing when the cornerstone of St. Patrick's was laid on June 8, 1809. Construction took just under six years, with the sanctuary being dedicated on May 14, 1815. In that same year, John Connolly, an Irish Dominican friar, arrived to take office as the city's first resident bishop. When complete, the church was the largest in the city. Its outer dimensions are 120 by 80 feet, and the inner vault is 85 feet high (37m x 24m x 26m).

Until 1830 the cathedral was the ending place of New York's annual St. Patrick's Day parade. After that, it ended further south along Mott Street at the Church of the Transfiguration, whose pastor, Felix Varela, was a Spanish political refugee from Cuba. In New York, he served as the chaplain off the Hibernian Universal Benevolent Society. Eventually, the parade moved uptown to pass in front of the new St. Patrick's Cathedral (1879).

In 1836, the original cathedral was the subject of an attempted sack after tensions between Irish Catholics and anti-catholic Know-Nothing nativists led to a number of riots and other physical confrontations. The situation worsened when a brain-injured young woman, Maria Monk, wrote a book telling her "true" story – a Protestant girl who converted to Catholicism, and was then allegedly forced by nuns to have sex with priests, with the resulting children being baptized then killed horribly. Despite the book being debunked by a mildly anti-Catholic magazine editor, nativist anger at the story resulted in a decision to attack the cathedral. Loopholes were cut in the church's outer walls, which had just recently been built in 1834, and the building was defended from the rioters with muskets. Afterwards, the Ancient Order of Hibernians established its headquarters across the street from the church.

In 1838, the cathedral was the location for the funeral of Lorenzo da Ponte, Mozart's primary librettist, who had fled to America in 1805 fearing bankruptcy. He became a professor at Columbia University and started what eventually became the Metropolitan Opera. The funeral was attended by an enormous number of people.

On October 13, 1859, the cathedral was the venue for the lavish wedding of the 55-year-old Don Esteban Santa Cruz de Oviedo, an immensely wealthy Cuban landowner and slave-owner, to the 18-year-old socialite, Frances Amelia Bartlett, daughter of Washington Allon Bartlett, the family of whom was residing on 14th Street. The marriage was heralded by the press as "The Diamond Wedding," after the luxurious preparations were revealed, including opulent gifts of jewelry by the groom. It also sparked public debate and mockery over the issue of May–December unions.

On October 7, 1866, the cathedral was gutted by a fire that spread from a nearby shop. Even though the new St. Patrick's was already under construction, the old cathedral was restored under the direction of architect Henry Engelbert. The first Mass was celebrated in the rebuilt cathedral on April 1, 1867. The new Old Cathedral was reopened in 1868.

Since the current St. Patrick's Cathedral opened in 1879, St. Patrick's Old Cathedral has been a parish church, the pastor residing in the old Bishop's House at 263 Mulberry Street. Today's multi-ethnic parish includes the territory of the former Most Holy Crucifix Parish, whose church for a time was the nearby Chapel of San Lorenzo Ruiz and housed the Filipino Catholic Apostolate for the Archdiocese of New York.

== Cathedral complex ==
St. Patrick's Old Cathedral School at 32 Prince Street, across from the cathedral, predates the church itself. It was built in 1825–1826 as the Roman Catholic Orphan Asylum, operated by the Sisters of Charity. In 1851, the asylum became for girls only, and in 1886 became St. Patrick's Convent and Girls School, before turning co-educational again. The Federal-style building is a New York City landmark, designated in 1966. The school finally closed in 2010 as enrollment dwindled, and the building was converted into residential and office space.

In 1859, a "Gingerbread Gothic" Chancery Office Building was built at 266 Mulberry Street, just north of the sanctuary, designed by James Renwick Jr. and William Rodrigue, who would go on to design the new cathedral. The building would later become St. Michael's Chapel and, from 1936 until 2019, St. Michael's Russian Catholic Church of the Byzantine Rite. St. Michael's is the last Russian Catholic church in New York City, and was one of only four remaining such sanctuaries in the United States. Those services are now held at the Church of St. Catherine of Siena, 411 East 68th Street on the Upper East Side of Manhattan.

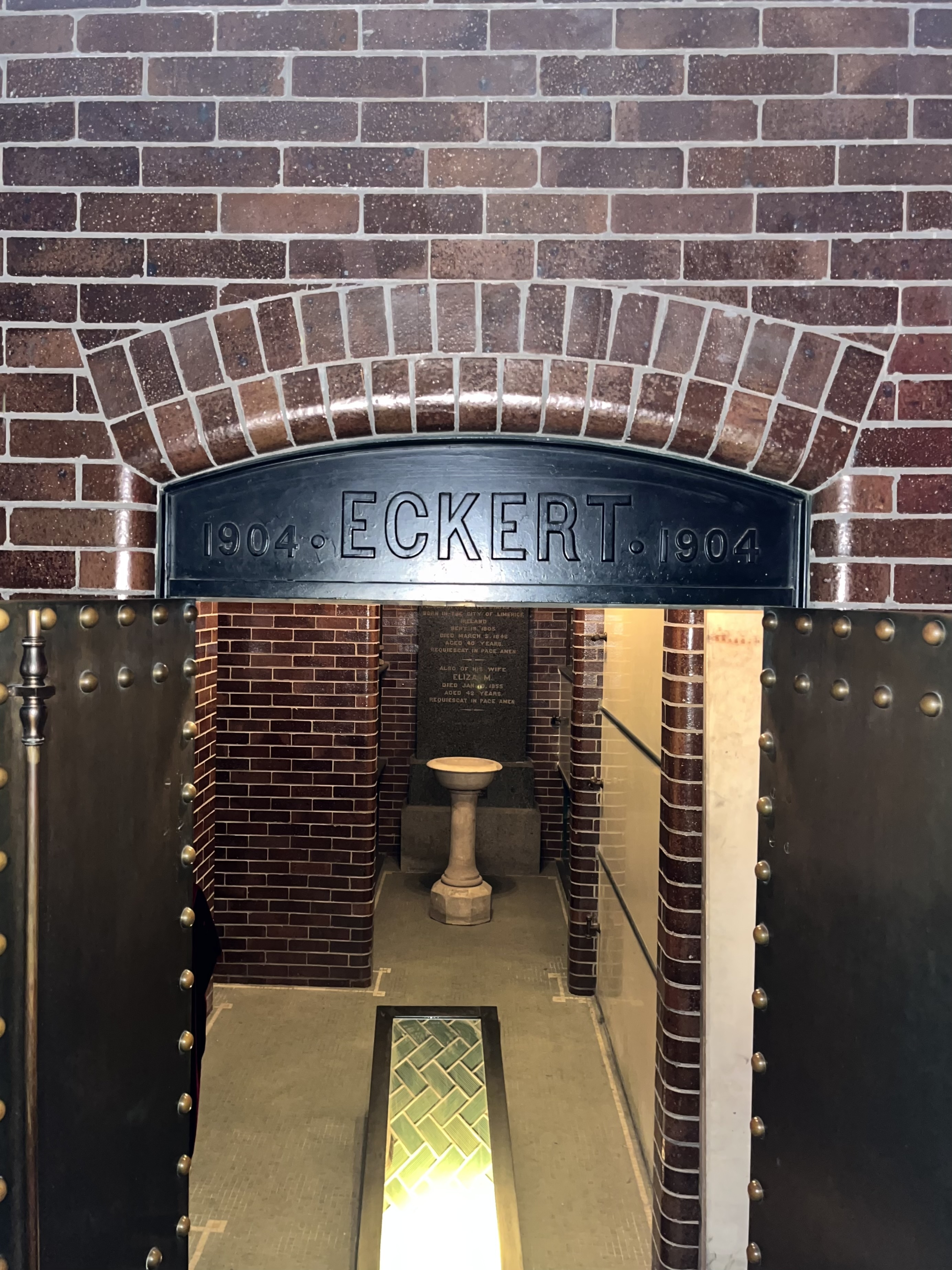
Eckert crypt in the catacombs lit by Edison light bulbs

Underneath the basilica are catacombs which currently consist of 35 family crypts and 5 clerical vaults, and which have reopened to new interments. The basilica has also opened the catacombs to walking tours. Among the notable interments are the first resident Bishop of New York John Connolly, General Thomas Eckert, several members of the Delmonico restaurant family, Countess Annie Leary, the prominent wine merchant Dominick Lynch, and Congressman John Kelly. In addition, two New Yorkers who are currently on the road to sainthood, Pierre Toussaint and Father Isaac Hecker, were originally interred there before being moved; Toussaint to the new St. Patrick's Cathedral, and Hecker to St. Paul the Apostle Church. The founding mother superior of New York's first Sisters of Mercy convent, Mary Agnes O'Connor, is also buried there.

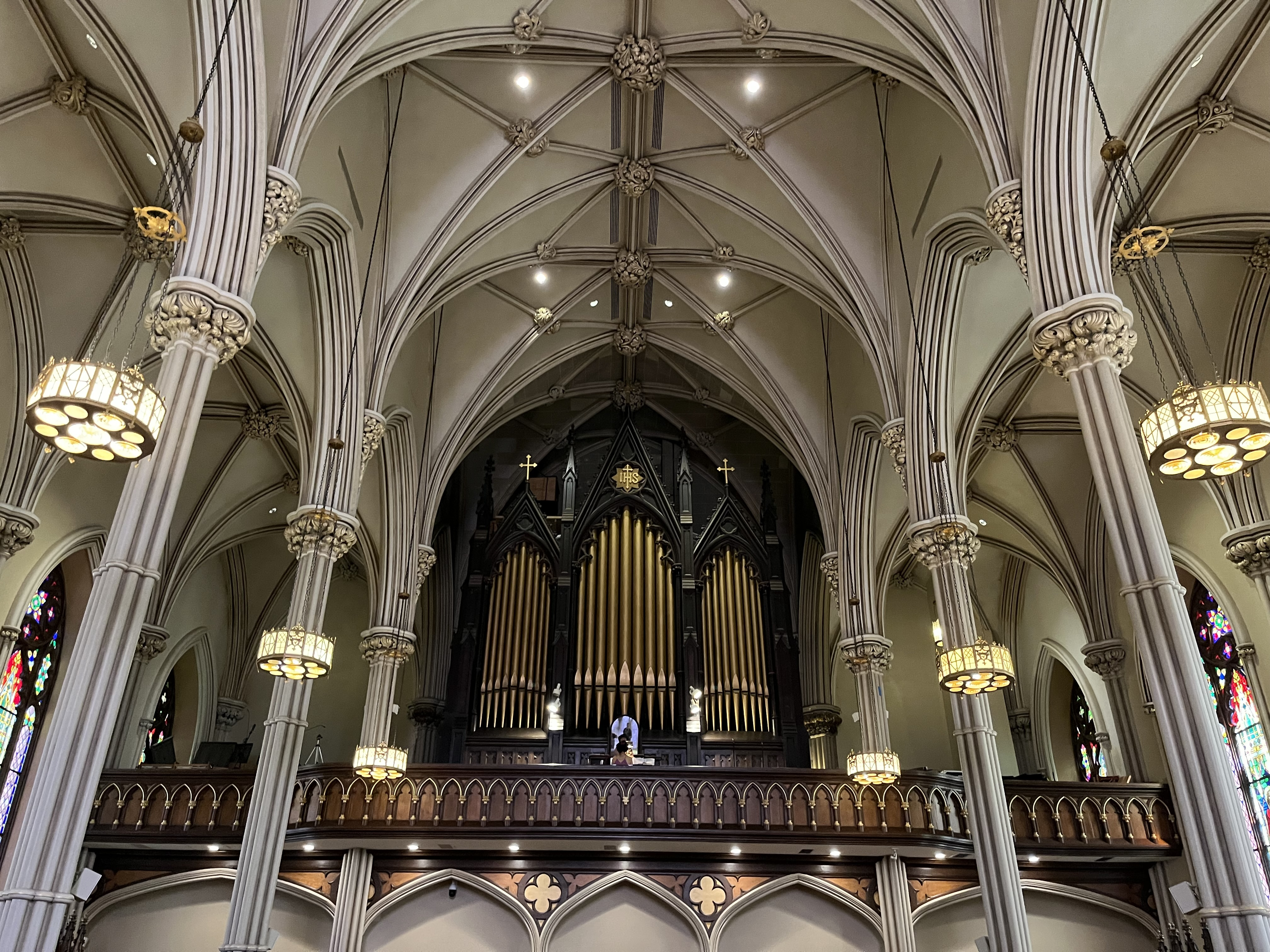
Organ at Old St. Patrick's Cathedral

Old St. Patrick's Cathedral gallery holds a large pipe organ that was built in 1868 by Henry Erben, originally operated without any use of electricity. After the new cathedral opened uptown in 1879, the Erben organ was left downtown with minimal alterations. In 2004, the Organ Historical Society designated it as an instrument of "exceptional historical merit, worthy of preservation", the organ equivalent of national landmark status. The instrument remains in use for Sunday services while awaiting further restoration.

== Gallery ==
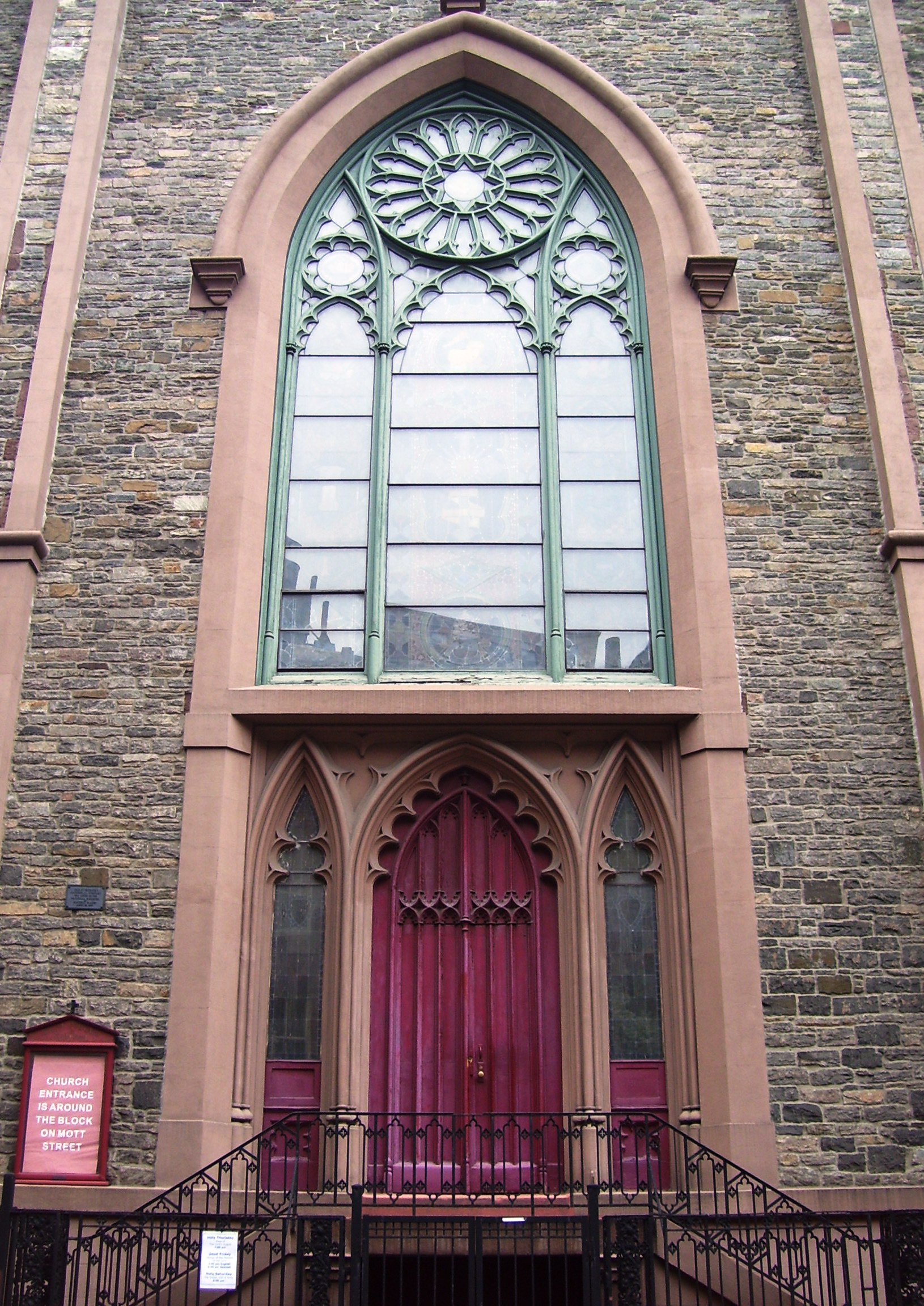
Mulberry Street entrance

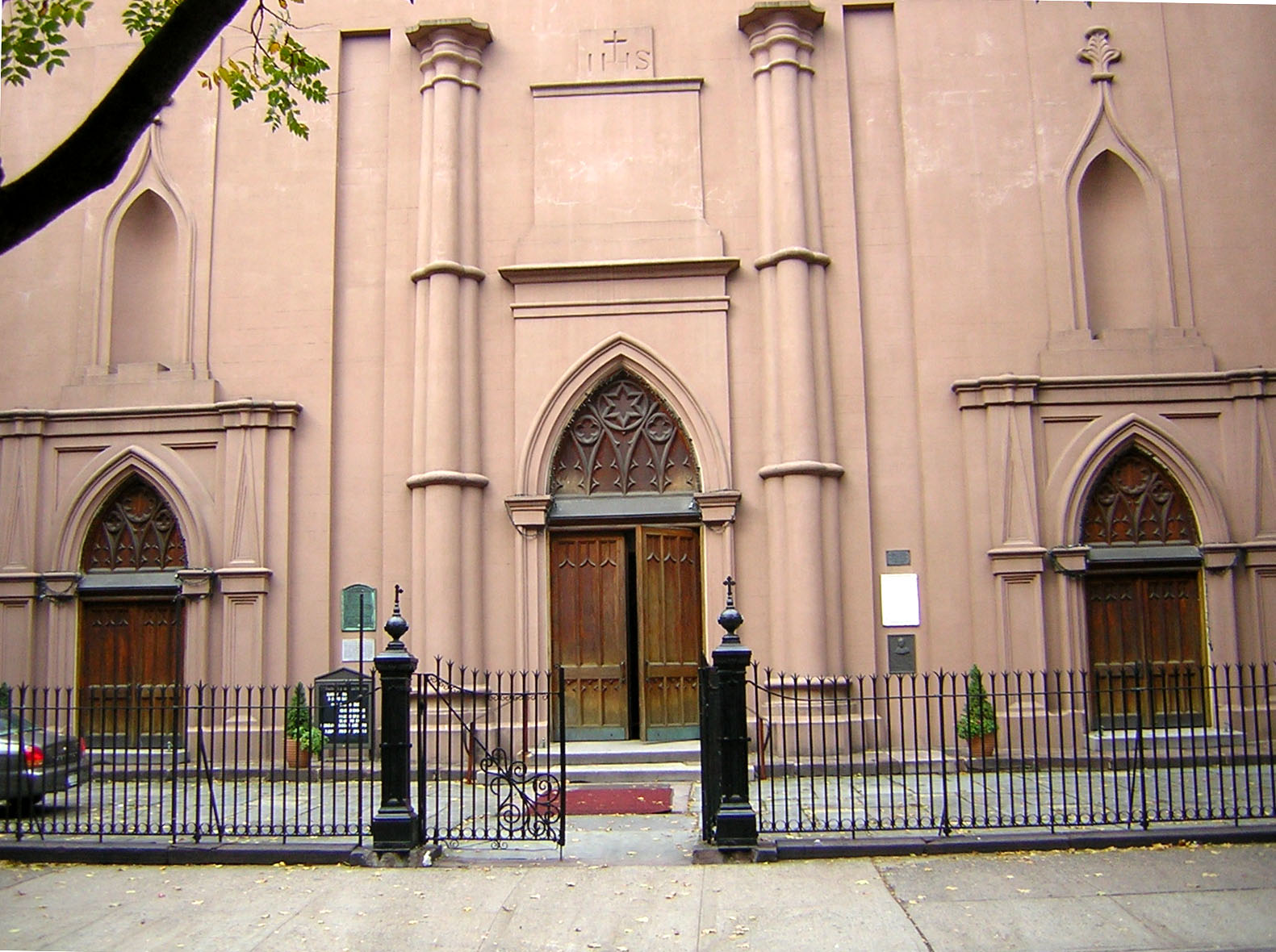
Mott Street entrance

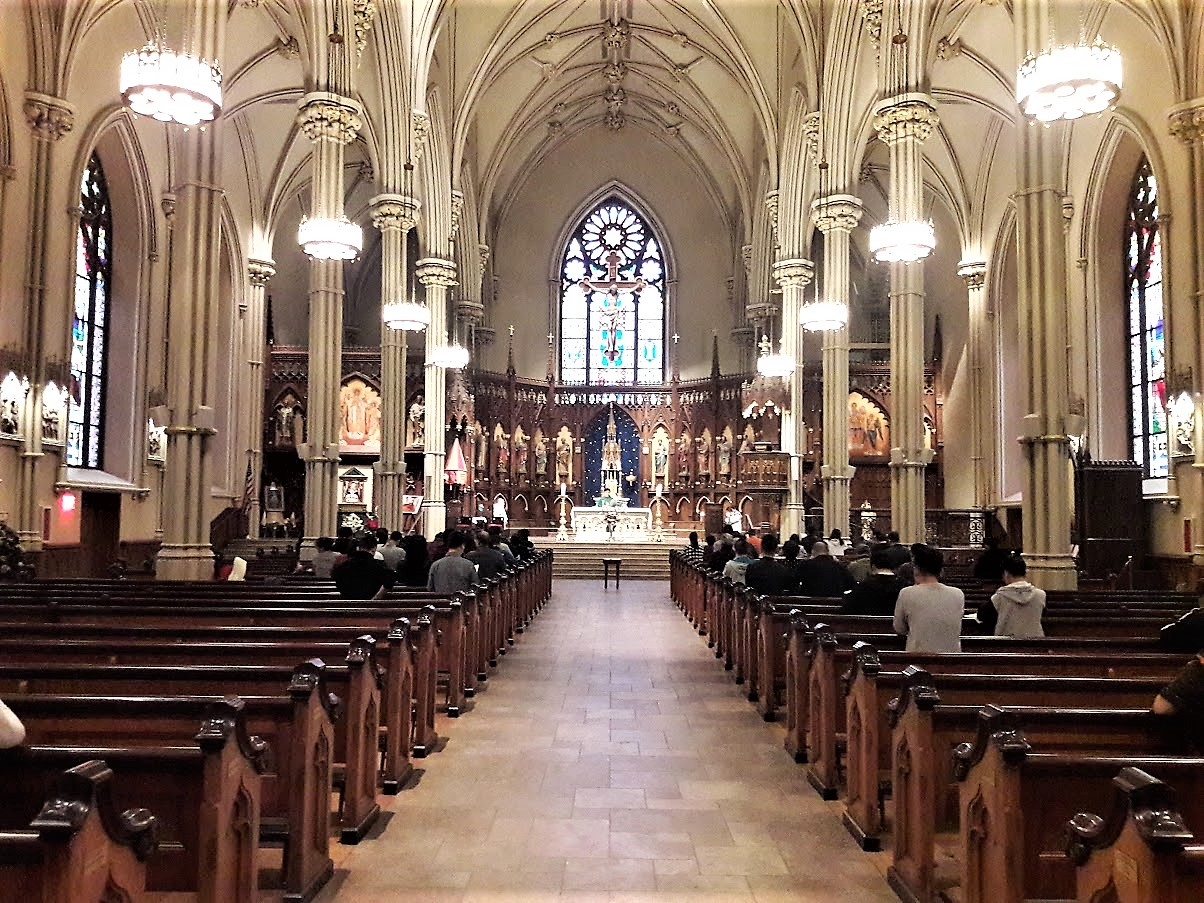
Interior

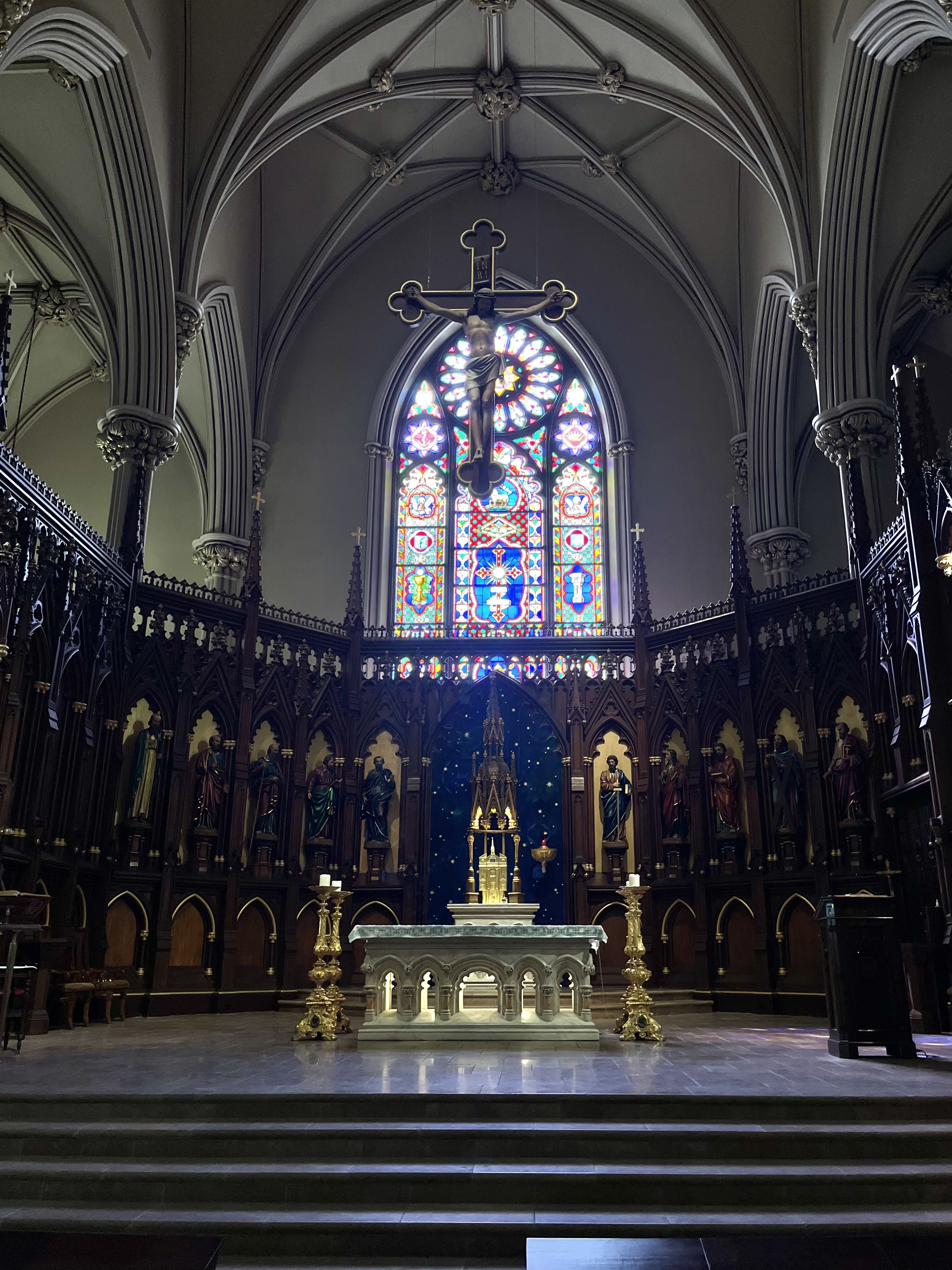
Altar

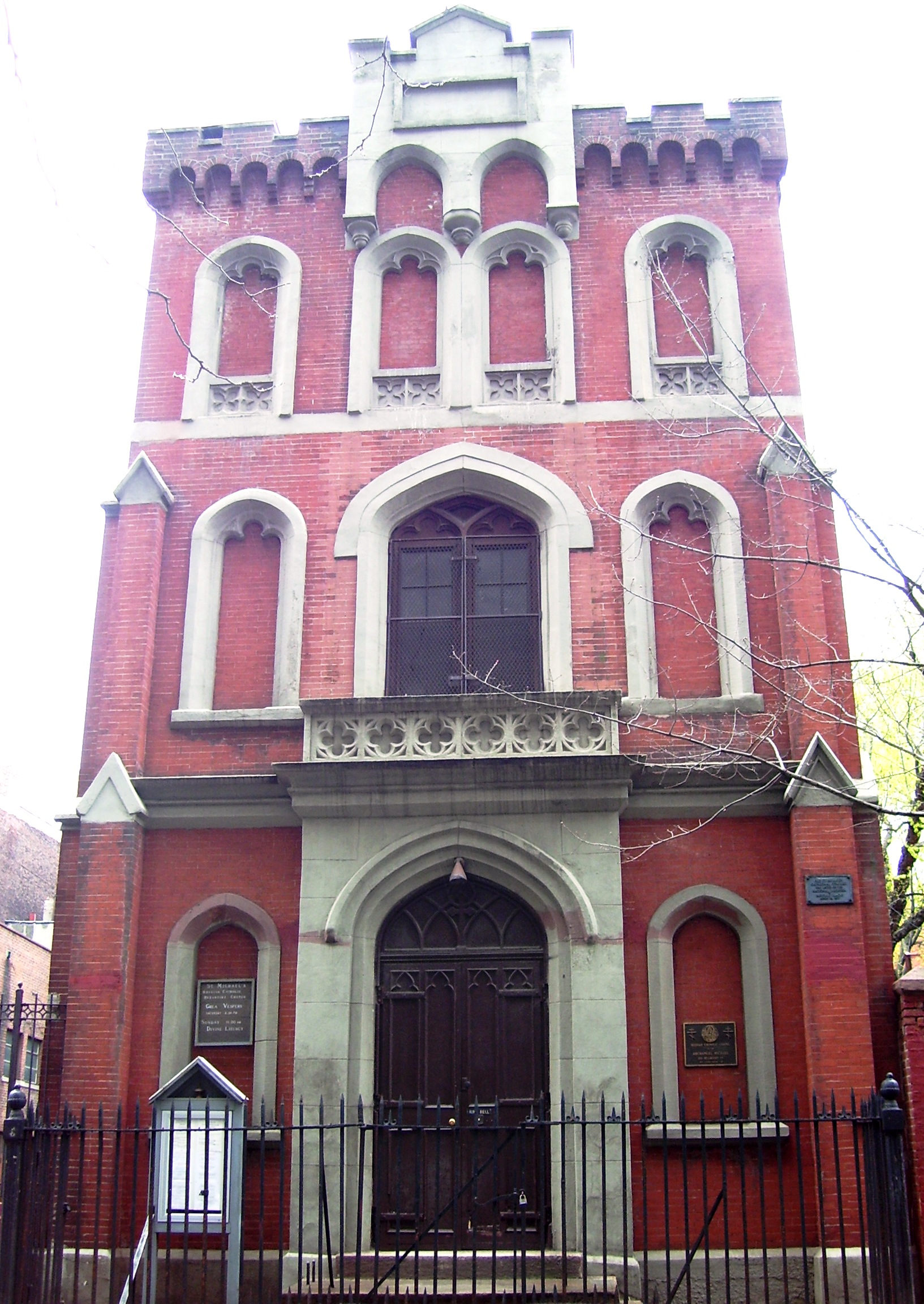
Former Chancery

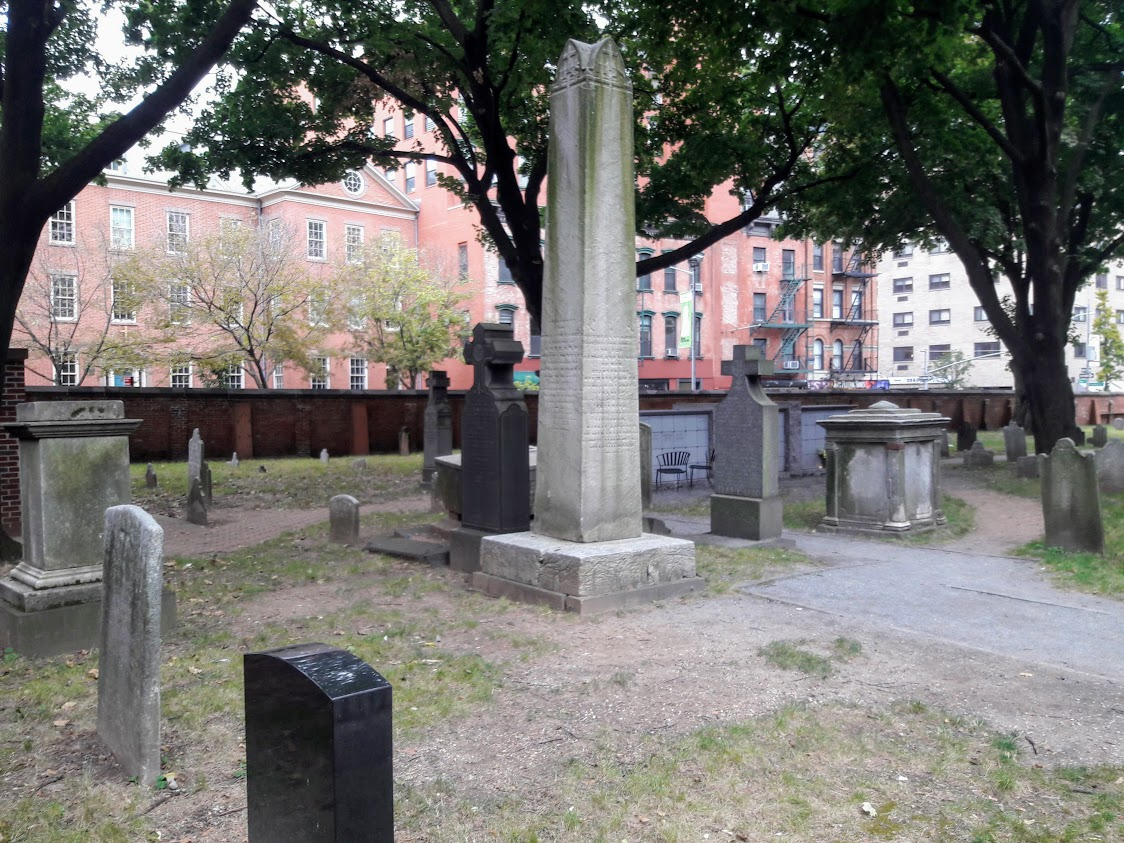
Cemetery

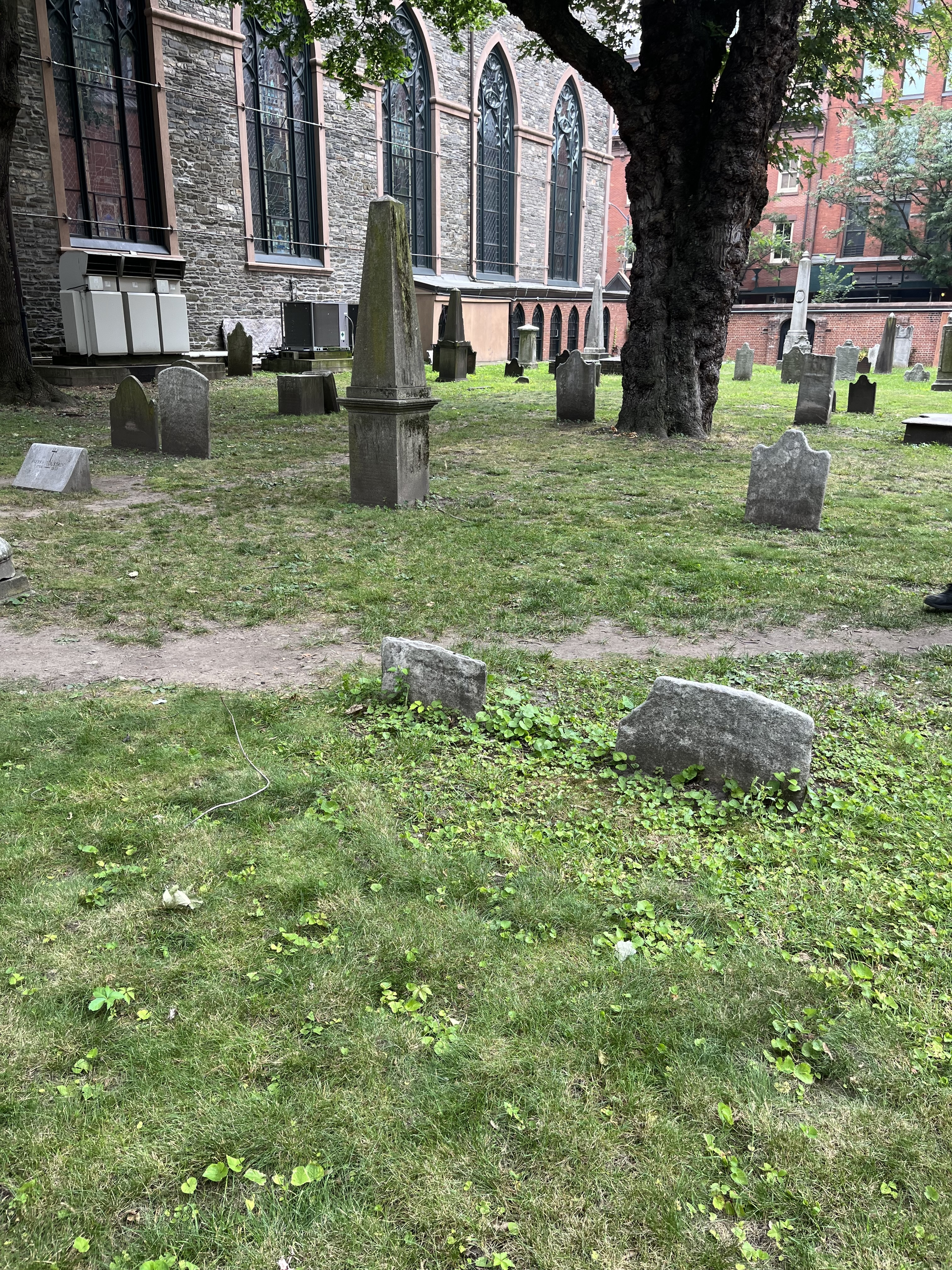
Alternate view of cemetery

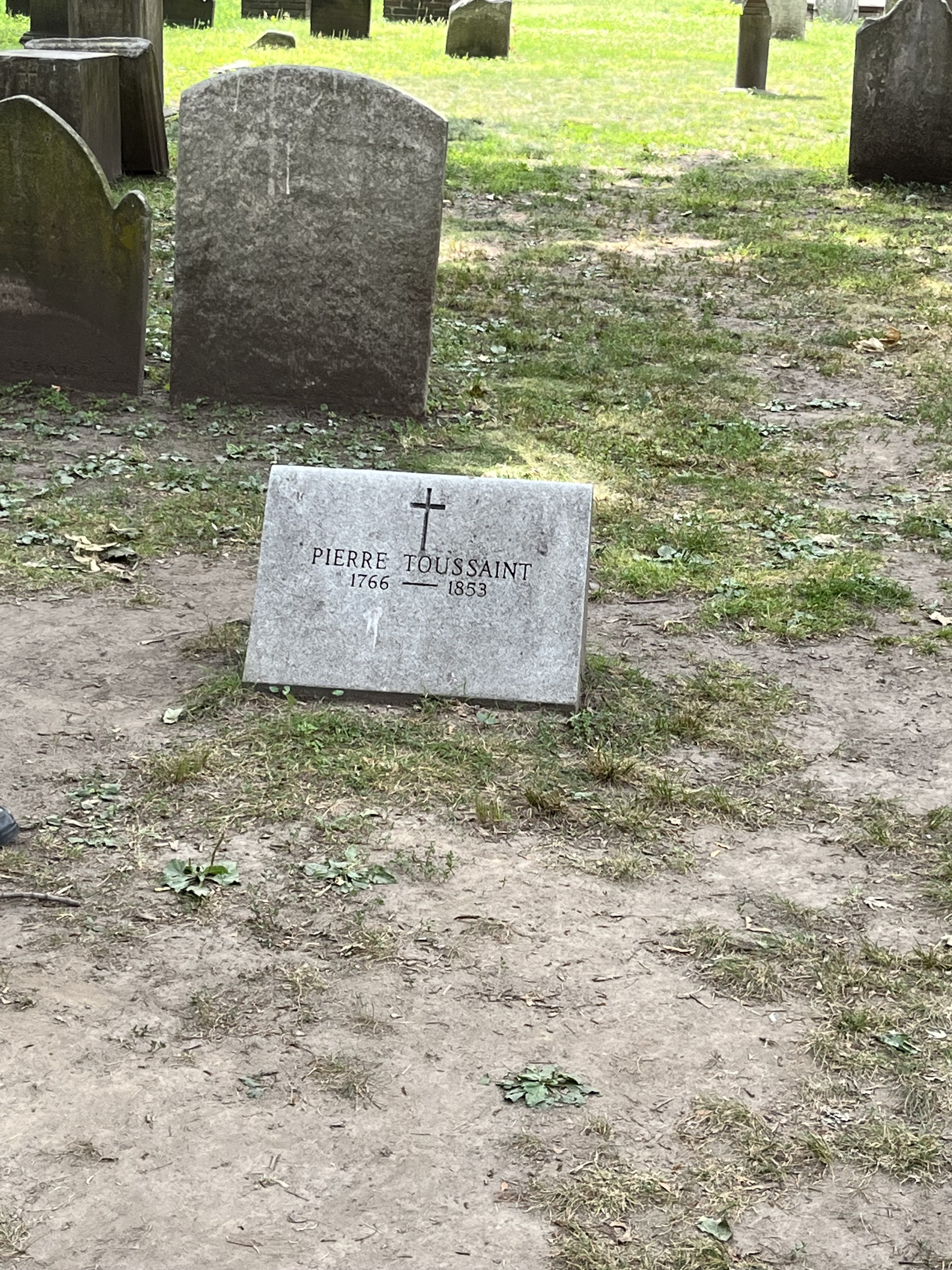
Grave of Pierre Toussaint (1766–1853)

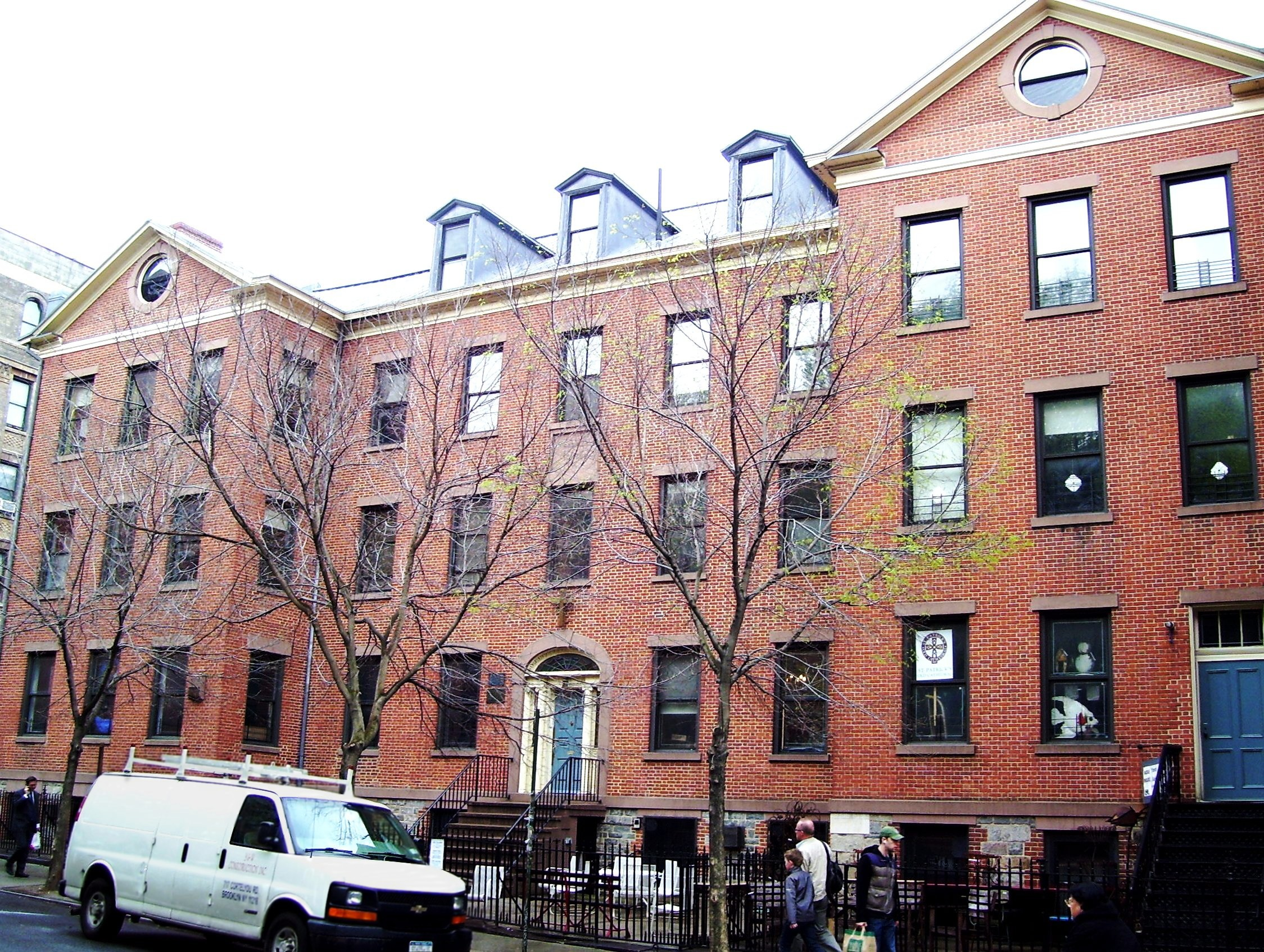
Former School

== See also ==
- List of Catholic cathedrals in the United States
- List of cathedrals in the United States
- List of New York City Designated Landmarks in Manhattan below 14th Street
- National Register of Historic Places listings in Manhattan below 14th Street
- Philadelphia Nativist Riots

== Bibliography ==
- Burrows, Edwin G. and Wallace, Mike (1999). Gotham: A History of New York City to 1898. New York: Oxford University Press. ISBN 0-195-11634-8.
- Feighery, Kate. " 'Everything Depends on the First Year': Archbishop John Hughes and his Fundraising Plan for St. Patrick's Cathedral." American Journal of Irish Studies 12 (2015): 57–76. JSTOR 43657250 (online}
- New York City Landmarks Preservation Commission; Dolkart, Andrew S.; Postal, Matthew A. (2009). Postal, Matthew A. (ed.). Guide to New York City Landmarks (4th ed.). New York: John Wiley & Sons. ISBN 978-0-470-28963-1.
