= List of hospitals in Staten Island =

This is a list of hospitals in Staten Island, sorted by hospital name, with addresses and a brief description of their formation and development. Hospital names were obtained from these sources. A list of hospitals in New York State is also available.

== Hospitals ==
- Richmond University Medical Center, branches at 355 Bard Avenue and 75 Vanderbilt Avenue, Staten Island. Both branches became Richmond University Medical Center on January 1, 2007.
  - The branch on Bard Avenue opened as St. Vincent's Hospital of Staten Island on Thanksgiving Day in 1903.
  - The branch on Vanderbilt Avenue opened on October 1, 1831, as Seaman's Retreat which was part of the Marine Hospital Service, became a United States Public Health Service hospital in the 1930s, and was sold to the Sisters of Charity of New York and renamed Bayley Seton Hospital in 1980.
- Staten Island University Hospital - formed via the merger of Staten Island and Richmond Memorial Hospitals in 1989.
  - North Division, 475 Seaview Avenue. Founded as the S.R. Smith Infirmary in memory of Dr. Samuel Russell Smith in 1861, moved to Tompkins Avenue in 1864, moved to 85 Hannah Street in 1870, moved to 101 Stanley Avenue (later Castleton Avenue) in 1890, renamed Staten Island Hospital in 1916, moved to 475 Seaview Avenue in 1979.
  - South Division, 375 Seguine Avenue. Founded as Richmond Memorial Hospital in 1920.

== Closed hospitals ==
Includes former names of hospitals

- Bayley Seton Hospital, 75 Vanderbilt Avenue, Staten Island. See Richmond University Medical Center in the section on hospitals in Staten Island above.
- Doctor's Hospital of Staten Island, 1050 Targee Street, Staten Island. Founded as Sunnyside Hospital in 1940, moved to make way for the Staten Island Expressway in 1940 and relocated to Targee Street in 1963, merged with Staten Island University Hospital, closed in 2003. The building was demolished and is now Public School 48.
- Embarkation Hospital no. 3, Hoffman Island, Staten Island. Opened as the Hoffman Island Army Hospital in December 1917. Renamed Embarkation Hospital no. 3 by the U.S. Army in July 1918, and closed on January 1, 1919.
- Field Hospital, at the South Beach Psychiatric Center, Staten Island. A temporary hospital that was opened for the COVID epidemic. Opened for the first wave from April 7, 2020, to May 21, 2020, and for the second wave from November 24, 2020, to April 21, 2021
- Halloran General Hospital, Willowbrook, Staten Island. Built as a hospital for disabled children, occupied by the U.S. Army as a veterans' hospital named for Col. Paul Stacey Halloran and open from November 1942 until April 1951. It became the Willowbrook State School which closed in 1987.
- Richmond Memorial Hospital, 375 Seguine Avenue, Staten Island. Opened on September 18, 1920, merged with Staten Island University Hospital and became its South Division in 1989.
- S.R. Smith Infirmary, 101 Castleton Avenue, New Brighton, Staten Island. Named for Dr. Samuel Russell Smith. It was renamed Staten Island Hospital in 1917.
- St. John's Guild Seaside Hospital, New Dorp, Staten Island.
- St. Vincent's Hospital, 355 Bard Avenue, West New Brighton, Staten Island. Opened on Thanksgiving Day, 1903. Became part of Richmond University Medical Center
- Seaview Hospital, 460 Brielle Avenue Staten Island. Opened in 1913, closed in 1961. Some of the remaining buildings are a nursing home.
- Sunnyside Hospital, Little Clove Road, Staten Island. Founded in 1940, moved to make way for the Staten Island Expressway in 1940 and relocated to Targee Street as Doctor's Hospital in 1963. Building was demolished for the highway.
- Veterans' Hospital (Fox Hills), Staten Island. Designated by the U.S. Army as Debarkation Hospital no. 2 and General Hospital no. 41, and opened as Fox Hills Base Hospital on June 1, 1918. Renamed United States Public Health Service Hospital 61 in 1920, renamed United States Veterans' Hospital 61 on February 13, 1922. Ordered closed on March 7, 1922, and all patients were transferred to other hospitals by some time in April.
- Veterans' Hospital (Willowbrook), Staten Island. Built as a hospital for disabled children, occupied by the U.S. Army and named Halloran General Hospital for. Col Paul Stacey Halloran, and open from November 1942 until April 1951. It became Willowbrook State Hospital which closed in 1987.

== See also ==
- List of hospitals in New York (state)
  - List of hospitals in New York City
    - List of hospitals in the Bronx
    - List of hospitals in Brooklyn
    - List of hospitals in Manhattan
    - List of hospitals in Queens
