= Floating Hospital =

Non-profit organization

The Floating Hospital
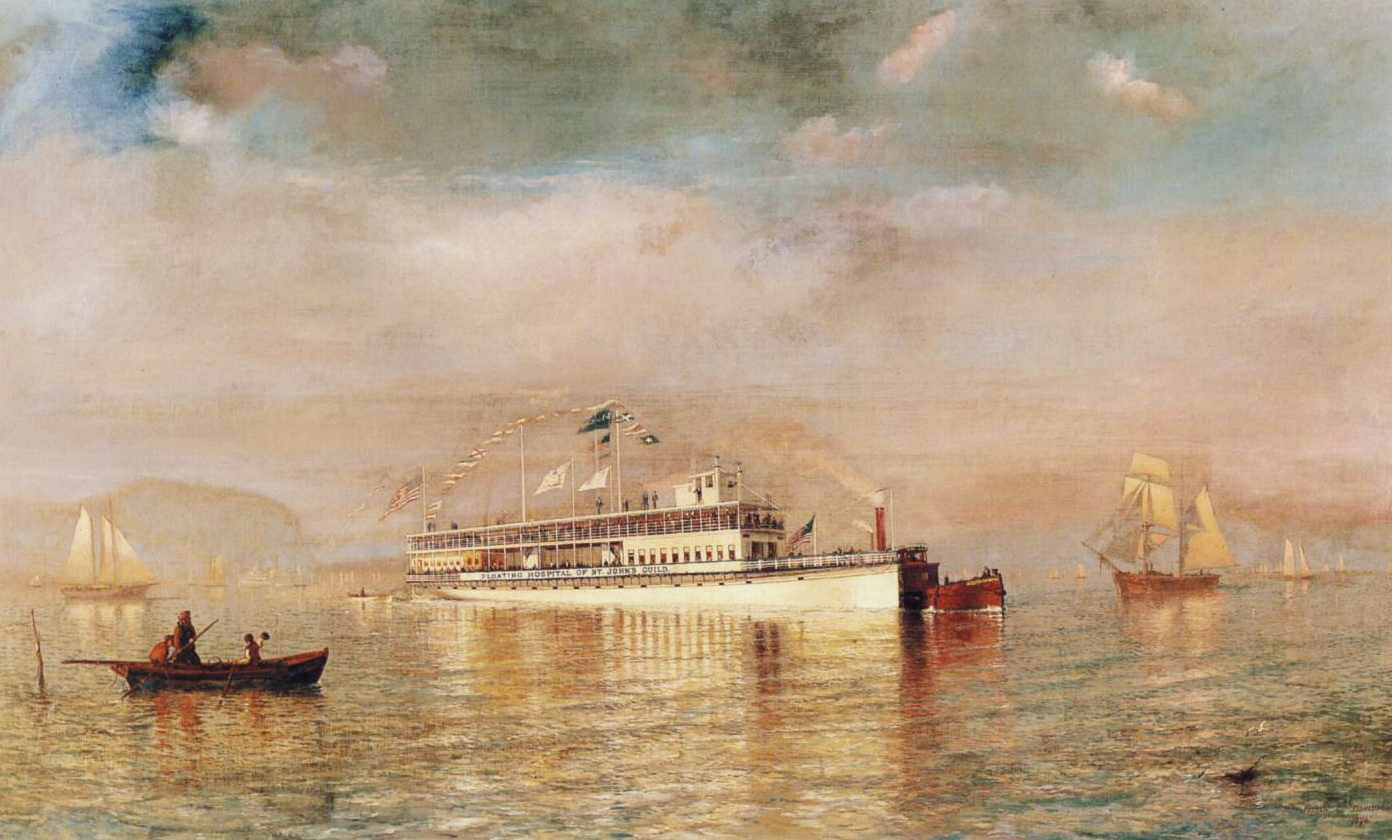
- The Emma Abbott, the first floating hospital vessel, in an 1876 painting

Geography
- Location: New York City, New York, United States

History
- Founded: 1866

Links
- Website: www.thefloatinghospital.org
- Lists: Hospitals in New York State
- Other links: Hospitals in Queens, https://www.instagram.com/thefloatinghospitalarchive/

The Floating Hospital is a non-profit organization that provides healthcare services to medically underserved communities in New York City, both from its headquarters in Long Island City, Queens and from satellite offices in other parts of the city. Today it is a land-based organization, but from its founding in the 1860s until 2001 the organization operated a succession of vessels which frequently cruised New York Harbor and nearby waterways, giving indigent children and their caregivers a respite from overcrowded tenements. While they were aboard, the Floating Hospital's staff of pediatricians, dentists, nurses, and social workers would provide healthcare services to children and health and nutrition education to their caregivers.

Despite its name, the organization does not operate a hospital in the usual sense. It has functioned as an outpatient facility from its earliest days, though it was affiliated with an acute care hospital prior to World War II. Presently, it is not affiliated with any other organization. The Floating Hospital for Children in Boston, founded in 1894, was inspired by the Floating Hospital in New York but was always a separate organization. It became a land-based acute care hospital in the 1930s and later merged with Tufts Medical Center.

== History ==
=== Founding ===
St. John's Guild was founded by the Rev. Alvah Wiswall of St. John's Chapel, on Varick Street, along with 12 volunteers on October 19, 1866 as a parish-based winter charity (encompassing the fifth and eighth wards). Their mission was a simple one, to help the poor of the parish “without regard to nationality, creed or color.” By 1872 membership had increased to 125 volunteers, providing free healthcare, food, clothing and coal. They also offered sewing classes (and had a free daycare for those mothers taking them) and were able to find employment for men, where possible.

In the summer of 1872, George F. Williams, a managing editor of the New York Times, witnessed a policeman forcing a group of newsboys in City Hall Park off the grass and onto the concrete walkways, which burned their feet. When Williams returned to his office the next day, he wrote an appeal to the Times' readership titled "Pity the Poor Children," (The New York Times, July 3, 1872) encouraging readers to reach out to the managers of the mission schools, particularly the Five Points Mission, the Children’s Aid Society, or appeal to doctors working in the poorer districts of the city, to help or offer donations that could make a difference. But by the next day, contributions were arriving not to those other institutions, but to the paper itself, with donors suggesting that excursions should be organized, to allow the poor children some fresh air.

With the success of the fund, the Times divided the city into four sections, with a superintendent to manage each section.

- Downtown—Charles O’Connor, Newsboys’ Lodging House.
- East-side—George Calder, Rivington Street Lodging House.
- West-side—Rev. Alvah Wiswall, St. John’s Guild.
- Uptown—Rev. Stephen Tyng, Jr., everything north of 14th Street.

That year the Times ran 18 excursions, with St. John's Guild heavily involved in the August trips. The following year the Times ran another 14 excursions, with the Guild involved in the first six, but by August the superintendents broke away and started a new fund called “The Society for the Relief of Poor Sick Children,” with Rev. Wiswall as president, and two trial excursions were organized, August 13 and the 28th, with a thousand mothers and children as passengers. From the Rev. Wiswall's perspective, it required many volunteer doctors to visit individual homes in his parish, but a few doctors on a boat could more efficiently look over hundreds of children with ease. Unlike the Times excursions, no destination would be necessary, and where the Times offered excursions to any poor child, this new fund would focus on sick children. Free healthcare, food and fresh air were all that was needed.

In 1874 St. John's Guild broke away from Trinity Church and, no longer tied to a parish, focused on the Floating Hospital idea, organizing 18 excursions on two hired barges. The first time “The Floating Hospital of St. John’s Guild” would appear in print was August 4, 1874, when announcing the first excursion two days later on the barge ‘Harvest Home,’ for a trip up Long Island Sound (New York Daily Herald, August 4, 1874). At this stage the Guild was still volunteer-based, with all donations supporting the mission. Additional expenses such as office space were paid for from the Guild's membership dues.

In 1875, the Guild purchased and outfitted its first vessel, the rebuilt "River Belle" (renamed the Emma Abbott, after the famous singer and benefactor, in 1899). This was followed by the "Helen C. Juilliard" (named after the benefactor) in 1899 and a second Helen C. Juilliard in 1916. The fourth ship was the "Lloyd I. Seaman" (named after a former trustee), launched in 1935 and the last ship was the Lila Acheson Wallace (named after the Reader's Digest philanthropist), 1973-2001. At its height, the Floating Hospital was taking 1,500 children (6 and under) and their mothers, six days a week, all through the summer.

St. John's Guild was dissolved in 1980 and the hospital reincorporated as a wholly independent entity.

=== Early years ===
In subsequent decades the Floating Hospital served over 5 million children and their caregivers, through their program of regular outings on their vessels (becoming six days a week during the summer months). Besides a strong recreational component, these outings also were seen as being medically important, because children were exposed to clean air and salt water, which were seen as curative by many people in that era, and also because while on-board they would be examined and treated by medical professionals. At the same time, other staff members could instruct caregivers in good child-rearing practices. A 1903 article in a nursing journal provides a sketch of the activities aboard the ship during these outings:

There are three landings daily on each side of the city and in Brooklyn. The first is made at eight a.m., and as the hospital approaches the pier one sees in line hundreds of anxious mothers carrying the sick children, who have patiently awaited the approach of the hospital for some time, for many leave their homes very early to get out in the free, open air. ... All cases which are too ill to be sent to the upper deck are immediately given either a dispensary or ward ticket, and between landings receive a reexamination by the hospital physician, who prescribes accordingly. Many cases come daily or as often as is necessary for the benefit of the sick child. ... Each family in the morning on entering the hospital and again during the noon hour receives a ticket bearing the number of children or adults who are entitled to receive milk, and these tickets are presented at the milk department at ten A.M and two P.M., when fresh, cold milk is distributed. ... Instructions of one hour are given tri-weekly by the chief of the nursing department to young mothers, half of the time assigned to the lecture being devoted to the care of infants, preparation of foods, etc., and the remaining half hour is given them for asking questions, and I can bear testimony that they show thought and an intense desire for better living. ... At the noon hour anchor is cast twelve miles down the bay and one mile from shore, practically at mid-ocean, and full benefit of the sea-air is obtained. Opposite this anchorage is the Seaside Hospital, to which the severe cases needing constant attention are transferred, always accompanied by the mother, who remains indefinitely, at the discretion of the hospital physicians. ... At three-thirty P.M. the anchor is raised and the hospitals return to the city, landing all at their respective piers, children improved and mothers wiser for the day's trip.

=== Seaside Hospital ===
The Seaside Hospital mentioned in the quotation above was also run by the St. John's Guild and was a frequent destination of Floating Hospital trips. It was located on ten acres on the shore of the Atlantic Ocean in New Dorp, Staten Island, and was founded in 1881 and greatly expanded in 1899. The sickest children were transferred from the Floating Hospital to Seaside Hospital, where they were cared for by doctors and nurses and where their mothers were also accommodated. Seaside Hospital was converted into a military hospital during World War II and demolished in the 1960s.

=== Later years ===
The Floating Hospital continued the basic formula of attracting families with recreational opportunities on board their vessel and providing professional medical services to them while they were aboard through the late 20th century. By the 1970s, the hospital described itself as "basically a disease prevention and referral agency" that focused on education, though it also provided outpatient services on its vessel, both during outings in summer months and while moored at its regular berth in the South Street Seaport during the winter.

The hospital's regular berth moved several times in its later years. After using a Hudson River pier near 44th Street in the 1980s, for much of the 1990s it bounced between two piers in the East River: Pier 11 at the foot of Wall Street and Pier 17 at the foot of Fulton Street. It was moored at Pier 11 in 2001 at the time of the September 11 attacks, which leveled the World Trade Center a short distance away. Though undamaged, the Floating Hospital would never again find a suitable mooring site. Pier 11 was needed for expanded ferry service to Lower Manhattan, and the management of Pier 17 was generally hostile to the presence of the vessel and its clients amid what they were promoting as an upscale retail venue.

In 2002, a temporary move to Brooklyn became permanent when the Floating Hospital was barred from Pier 17 and could not find another suitable berth in New York City where their clients could safely board the ship. In 2003 the Hospital sold its vessel and became a land-based facility based in Chinatown. In 2006, it moved its headquarters to Long Island City, Queens, an area designated at the time by the Federal government as medically underserved.

== Vessels ==
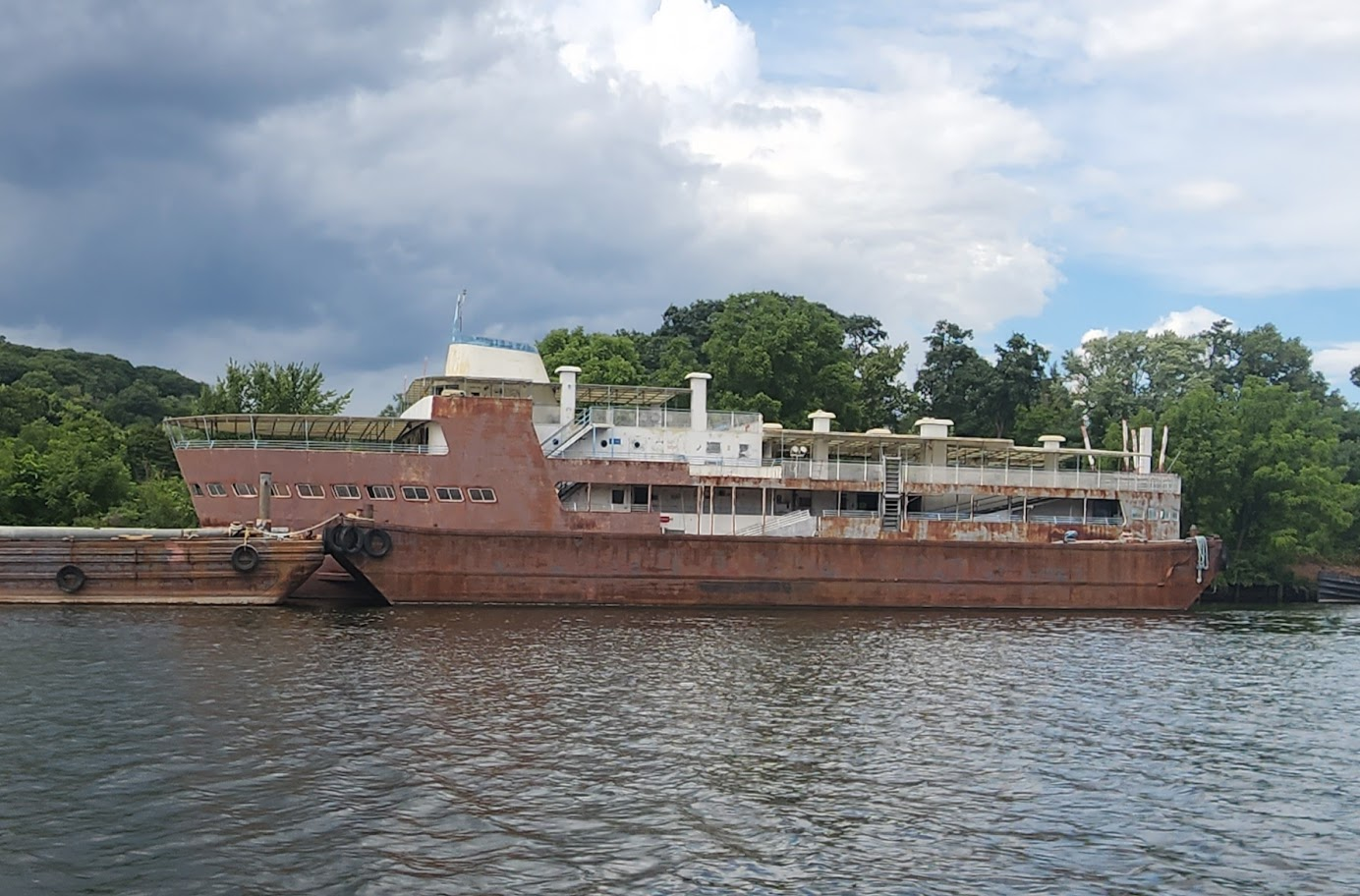
The Lila Acheson Wallace, in use from 1973 to 2003, moored in Kingston, NY in 2022

The Floating Hospital owned 5 vessels over the 130 years that it provided marine-based services. They were all engineless barges that were pulled around New York's waterways by tugboats. This was done to reduce the vibrations for sick children, reduce the risk of fire considerably, and open up space for passengers, dining rooms, and salt-water baths.

These were:

- River Belle (renamed the Emma Abbott in 1899), barge, 1875–1903
- Helen C. Juillard I, barge, 1899–1916
- Helen C. Juillard II, barge, 1916–1933 The second Helen C. Juillard was a wooden, non self propelled barge built from designs by Tams, Lemoine & Crane by the American Car and Foundry Company. The length on deck was 230 ft 8 in (70.3 m), breadth of 45 ft (13.7 m) with a 10 ft (3.0 m) draft. The craft had four decks, the lower running from bow to stern just above the hull, two decks above termed the main deck and upper deck that were set back from the bow atop which was the hurricane deck with pilot house, an isolation ward, boats, ventilators and such other necessary structures. There was a waiting room, examination rooms, operating room and four wards. The dining room could seat 400 people. There were living quarters and separate facilities for medical staff and crew. A boiler provided steam for powering auxiliary equipment and electrical generation. Refrigeration facilities for food and fresh milk were installed. Tanks provided storage for 1,500 US gallons (5,700 L) of fresh water and 10,000 US gallons (38,000 L) of salt water for showering. Life saving equipment, boats, rafts and life preservers were provided for a capacity of 1,600 people. A high capacity fire pump system with outlets throughout the vessel formed the fire fighting equipment. The barge was launched February 5, 1916, christened by the niece of the donor of the vessel, Mrs. A. D. Julliard.
- Lloyd I. Seaman, barge, 1935–1973
- Lila Acheson Wallace, barge, 1973–2003

== Gallery ==
Most of these photos are undated, but are from collections that date from about 1900–1916. The Helen Juillard vessel mentioned in the captions is probably the first one in most or all of these cases.

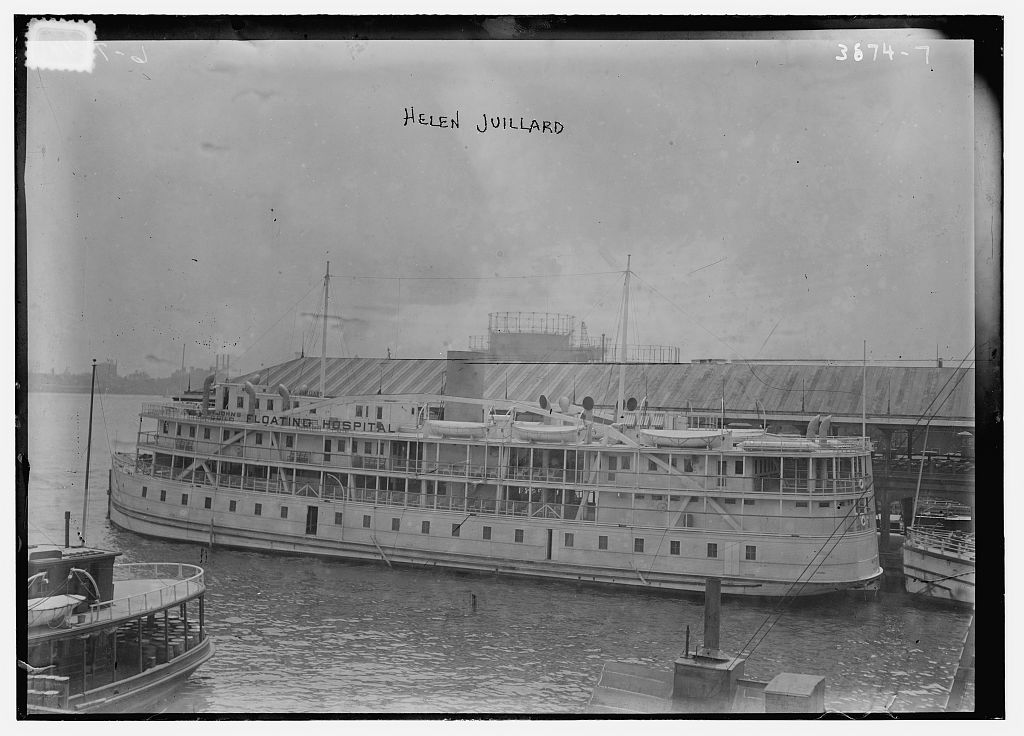
Helen Juillard at dock

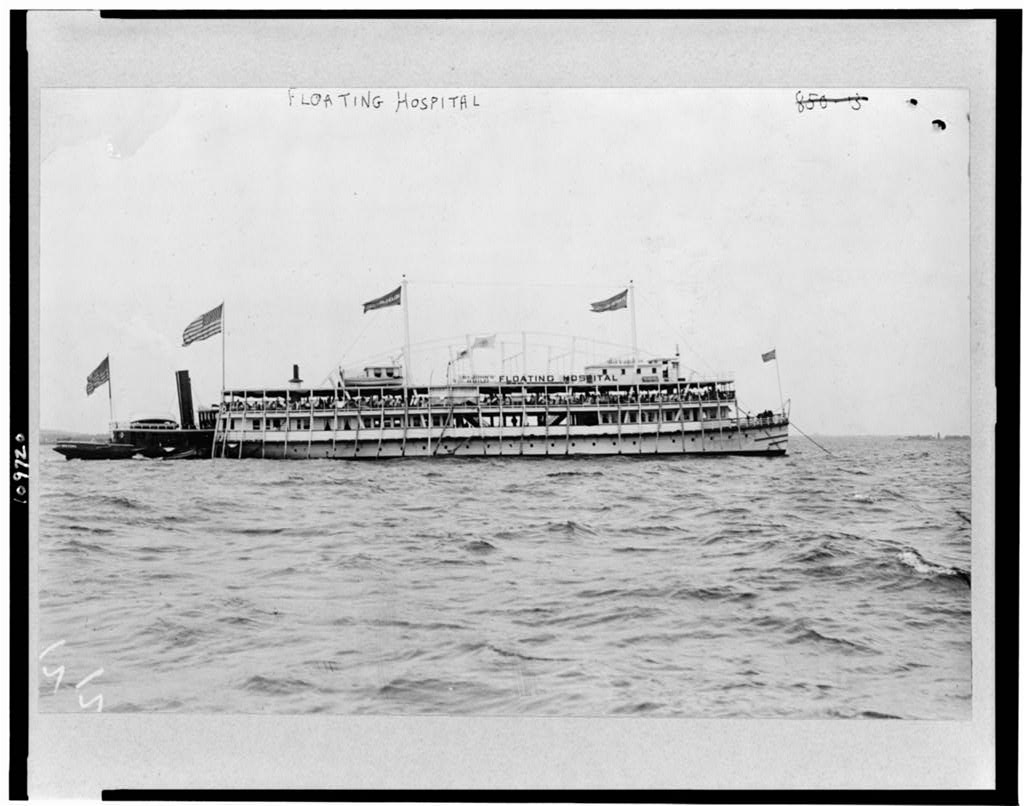
Helen C. Juillard afloat

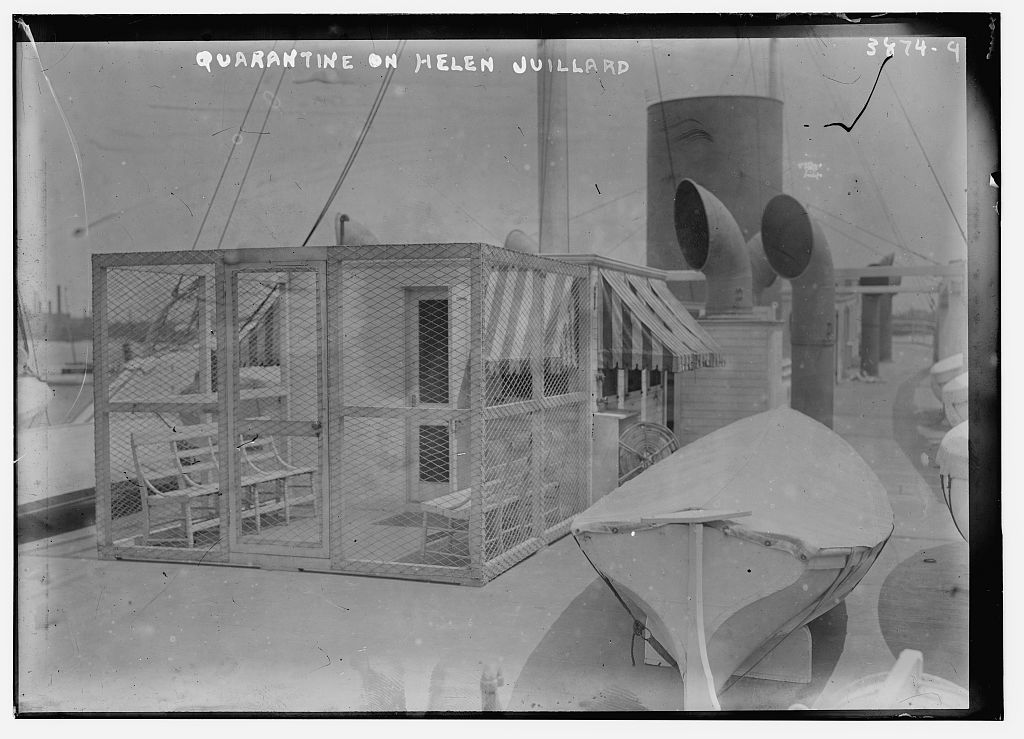
Quarantine on Helen Juillard

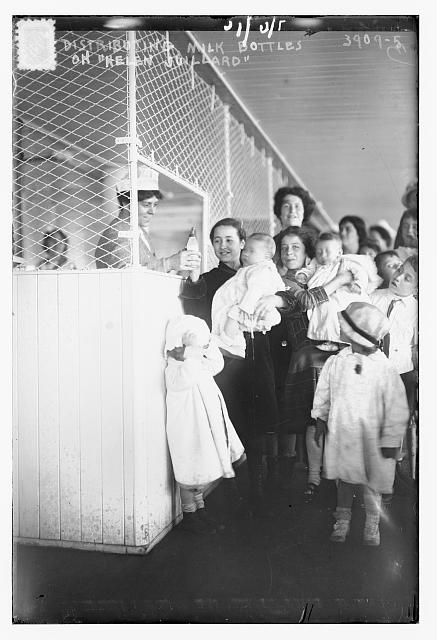
Milk line on Helen Juillard

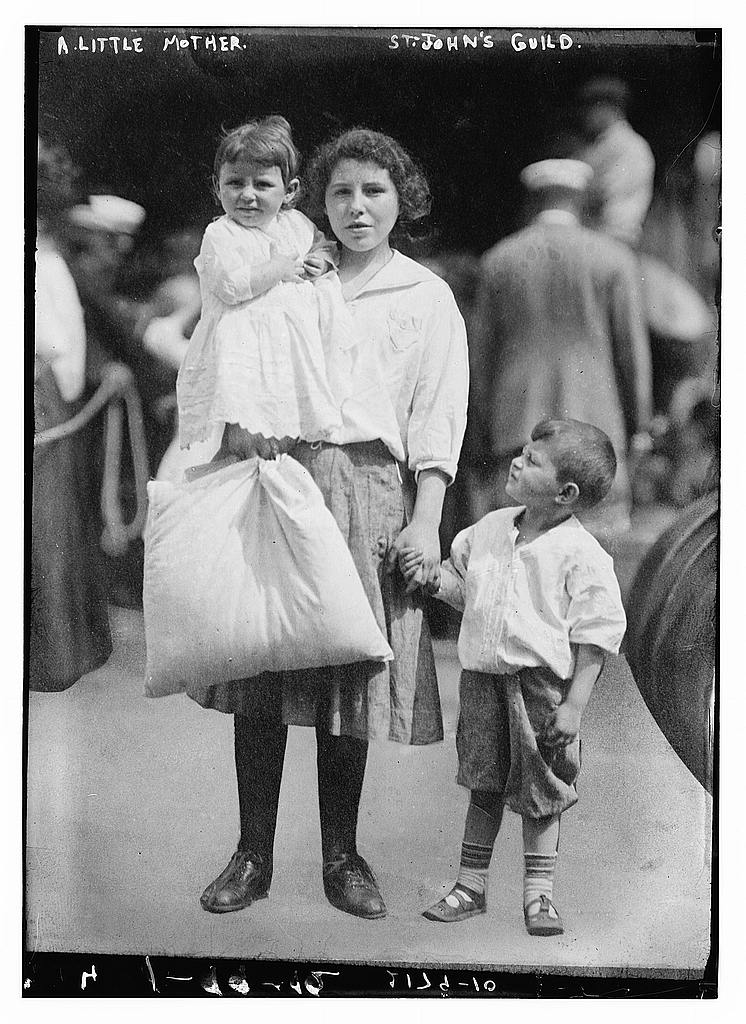
"A little mother"

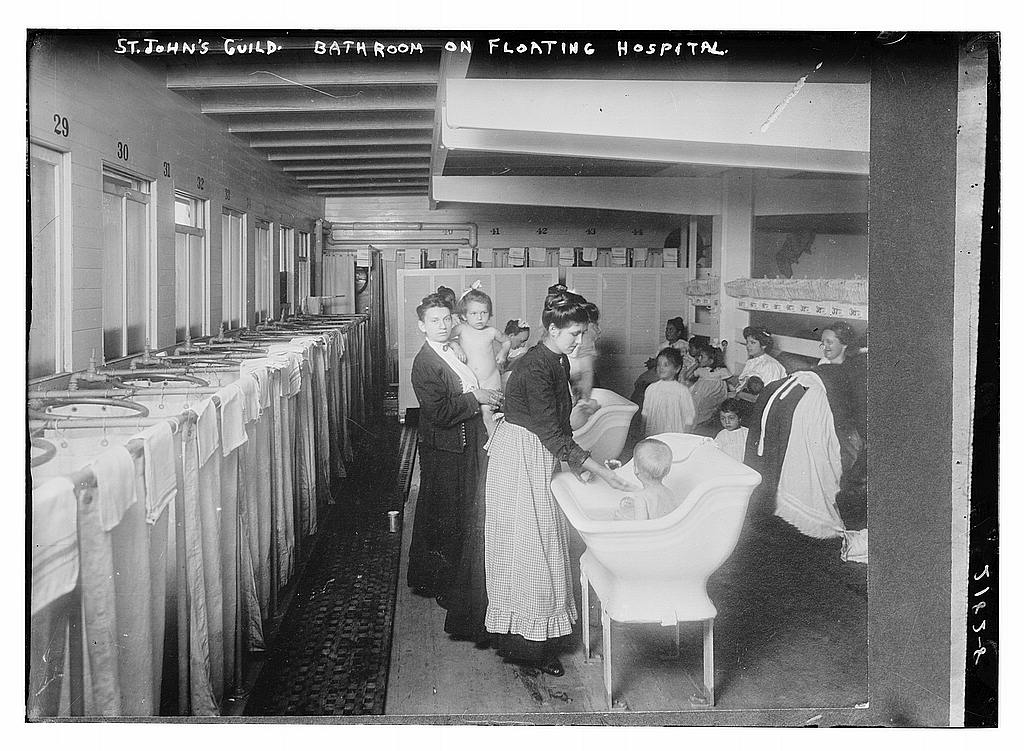
Bathroom on Floating Hospital

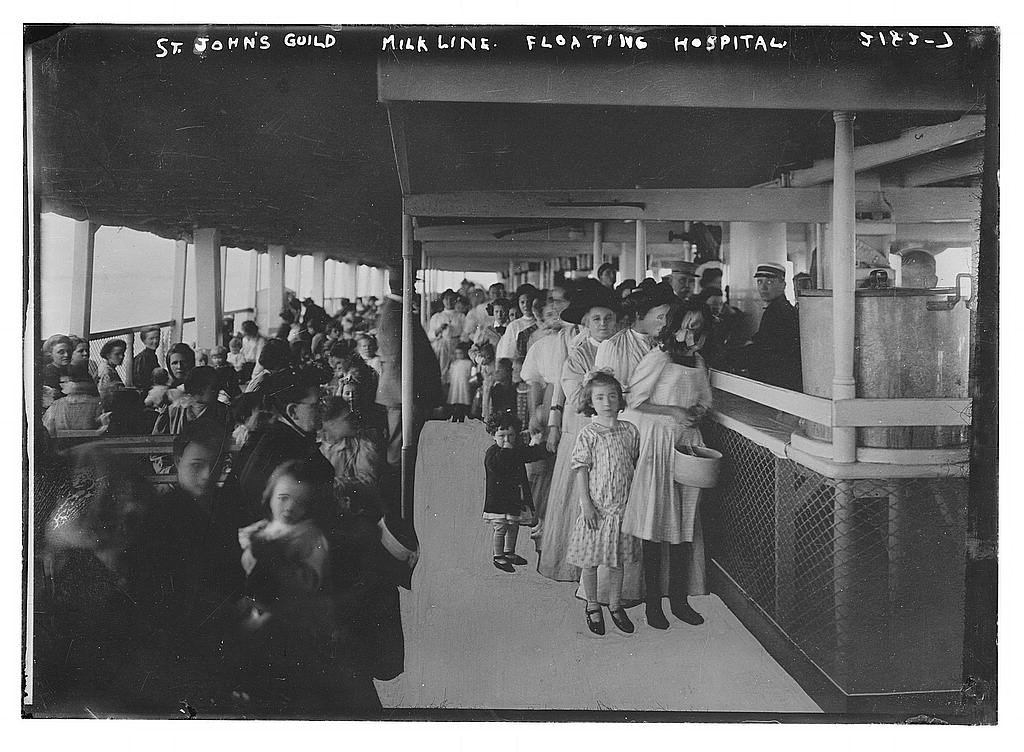
Milk line on Floating Hospital

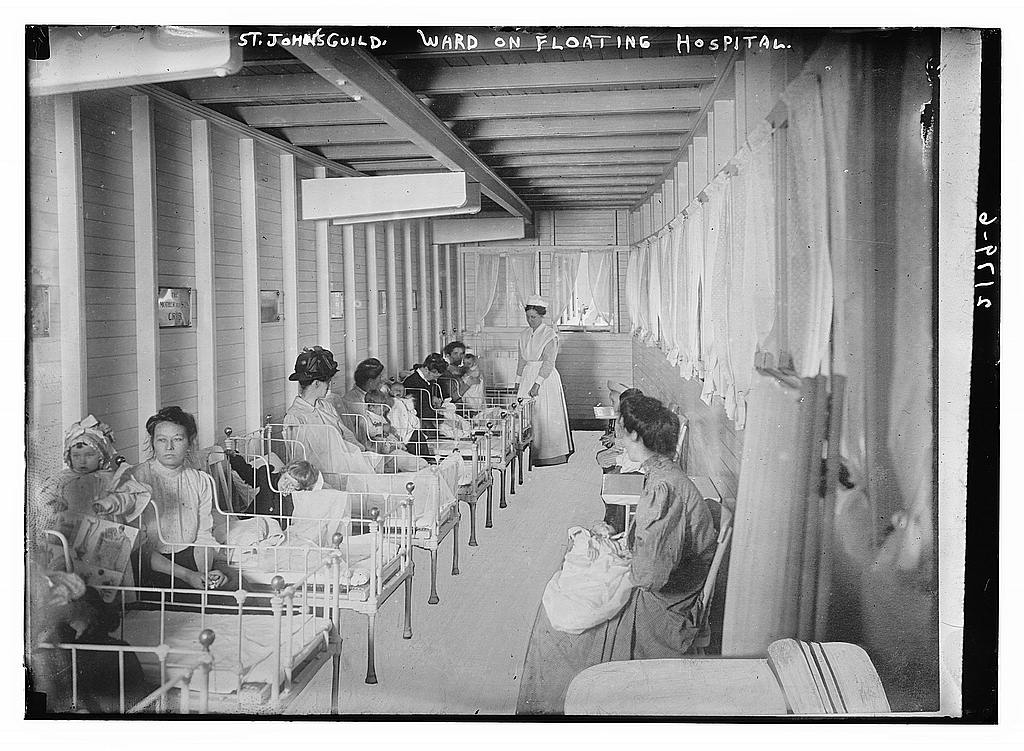
Nursery ward on Floating Hospital

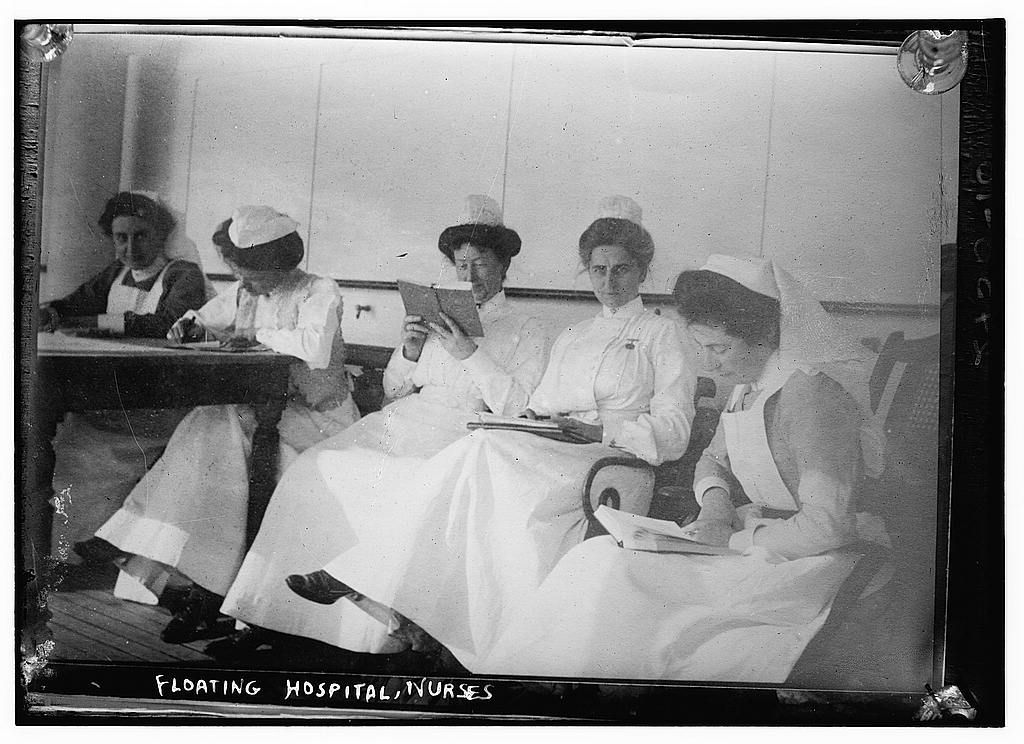
Floating Hospital nurses

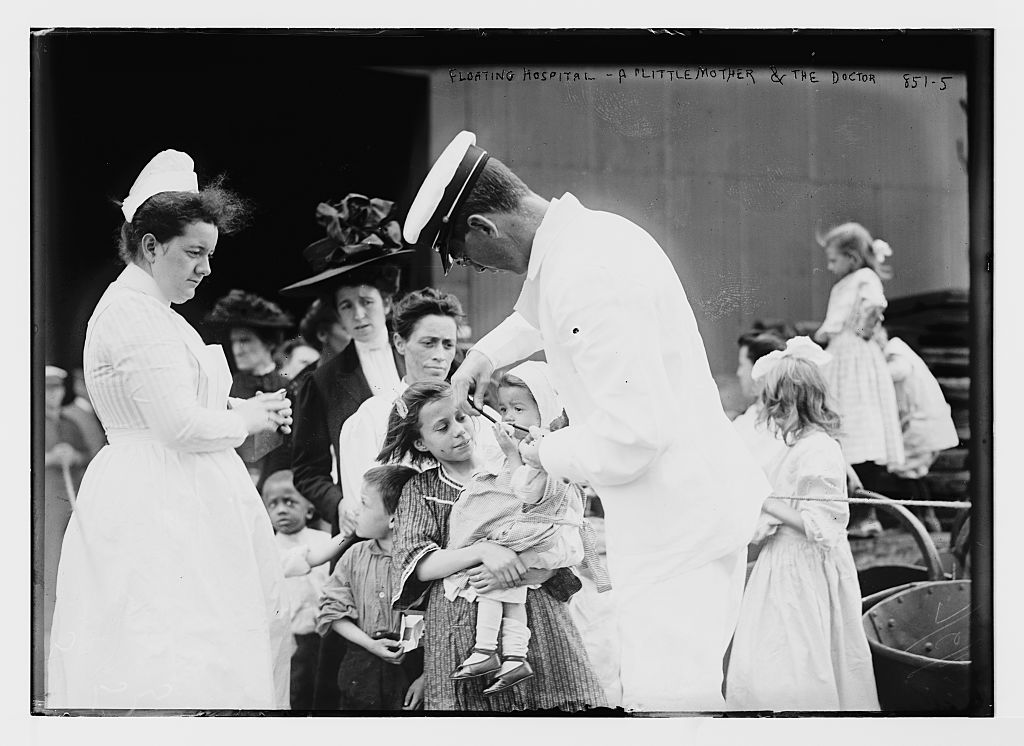
Doctor examining child on upper deck

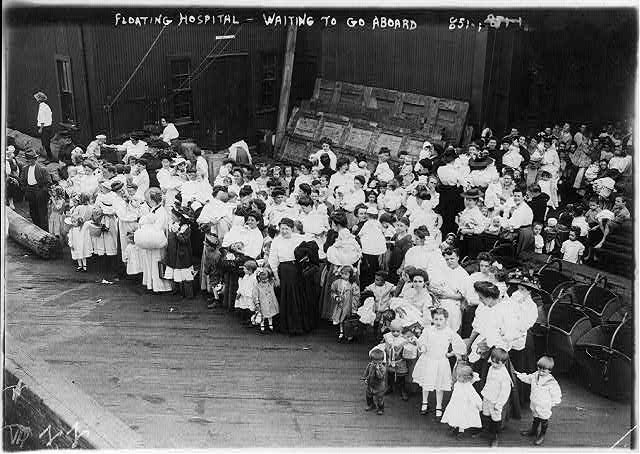
Waiting to go aboard

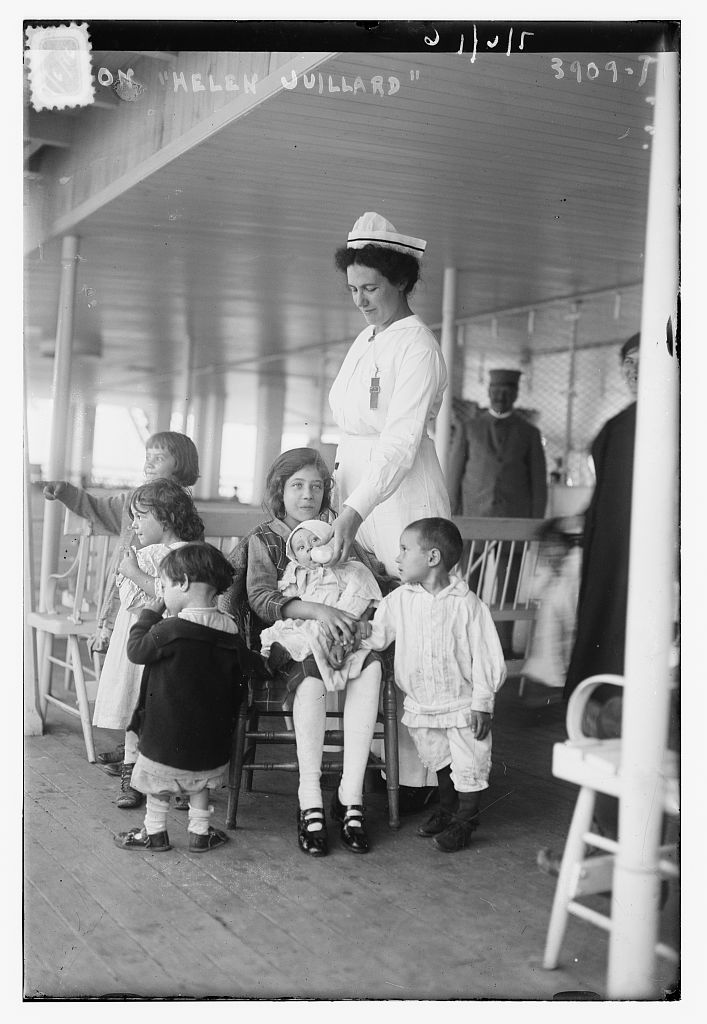
Nurse with children
