= Bayley Seton Hospital =

Hospital in Staten Island, New York

Coordinates: 40°37′20″N 74°04′32″W

- Sisters of Charity/Saint Vincent's Catholic Medical Center
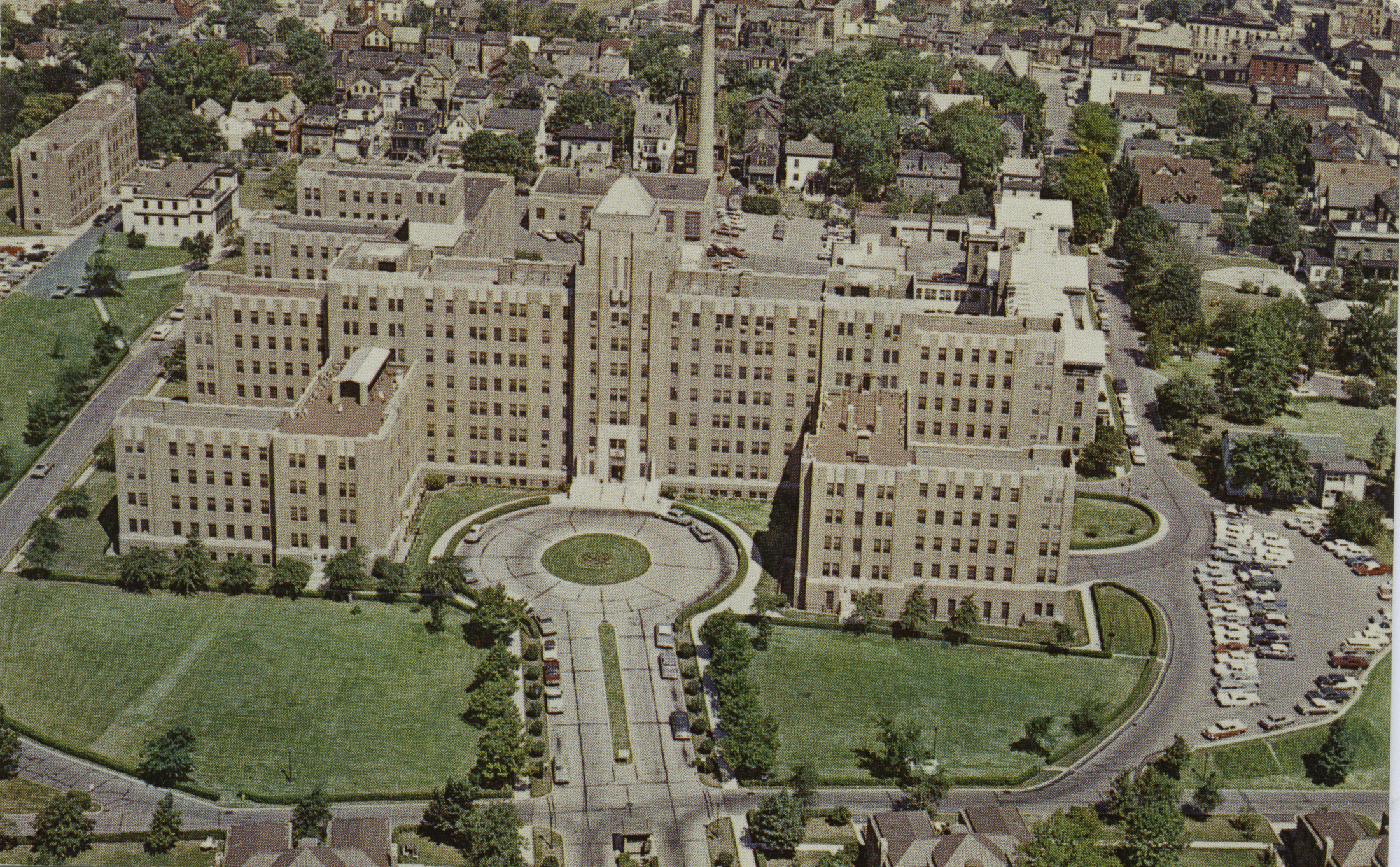
- "Respect, Integrity, Compassion, Excellence"

Geography
- Location: 75 Vanderbilt Avenue, Staten Island, New York, United States

Organization
- Care system: Public (former); Catholic (current)
- Type: General and Teaching (Former); Outpatient (Current)
- Affiliated university: New York Medical College

Services
- Emergency department: Previously Level 1, now closed

History
- Founded: 1831

Links
- Website: www.svcmc.org
- Lists: Hospitals in New York State
- Other links: Hospitals in Staten Island

Bayley Seton Hospital (BSH) was a hospital in Stapleton, Staten Island, New York City. It was a part of the Bayley Seton campus of Richmond University Medical Center but is permanently closed.

The campus was established in 1831 as a U.S Marine Hospital, and the current main building was constructed in the 1930s. In 1981, it became a private hospital.

== Location ==
Bayley Seton is located on a 20-acre (81,000 m^{2}), 12-building site in the Clifton and Stapleton areas of the North Shore of the New York City Borough of Staten Island. The complex is bounded by Bay Street to the east, Vanderbilt Avenue to the south, Tompkins Avenue to the west, and residential development to the north. The block, with portions sold off over time, also includes Public School 721, the Richmond Center for Rehab & Specialty Care Center, the New York Foundling Hospital Staten Island, and an unaffiliated geriatric center.

== History ==
=== Marine Hospital ===
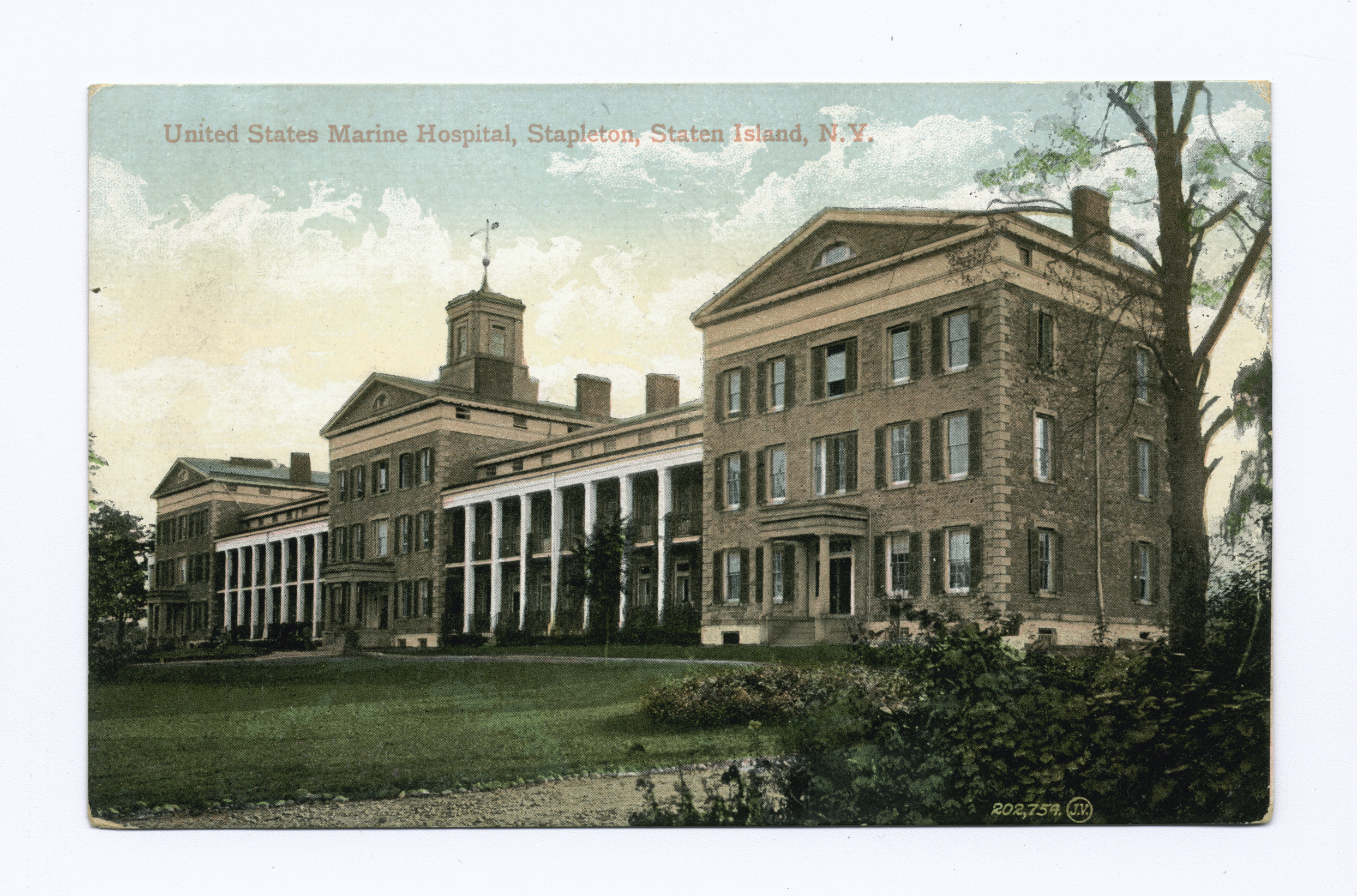
Original Seaman's Retreat building

On October 1, 1831, Staten Island's first hospital, the Seaman's Retreat, was opened here by the Marine Hospital Service, to serve retired naval and commercial sailors. Three of these original colonnaded structures remain as of 2024, dating from the 1830s and 1840s. The Marine Hospital Service provided medical treatment to naval personnel.

On May 6, 1857, the neighboring New York Marine Hospital (also the "Quarantine") in Tompkinsville, about 1 mile (1.6 km) north along the shore, was attacked by a local mob, fearful of the mostly immigrant detainees. The next year, on September 1, 1858, a mob again attacked the hospital, burning it down in what became known as the Staten Island Quarantine War.

A new quarantine center was created on Swinburne Island (a fill off the South Shore of Staten Island, about 2.5 miles (4.0 km) south of Fort Wadsworth). In 1874, some of these resources were transferred to the Marine Hospital Service buildings at what is now the Bayley Seton campus. The Seaman's Retreat was also housed there; when it moved around three miles (5 km) northwest in 1883, it became Sailors' Snug Harbor. At that point, the entire complex was operated by the U.S. Marine Hospital Service.

==== National Institutes of Health ====
With this move came a greater need for the study of disease. In 1887, 28-year-old officer Joseph J. Kinyoun established a single-room Laboratory of Hygiene for Bacteriological Investigation on the top floor of the Marine Hospital, where it remained until 1891. The building still stands and is part of Bayley Seton Hospital. In 1902, the United States Congress passed legislation to fund the laboratory and move it to Washington where, as a result of the 1930 Ransdell Act, it became the National Institutes of Health.

==== Later history ====
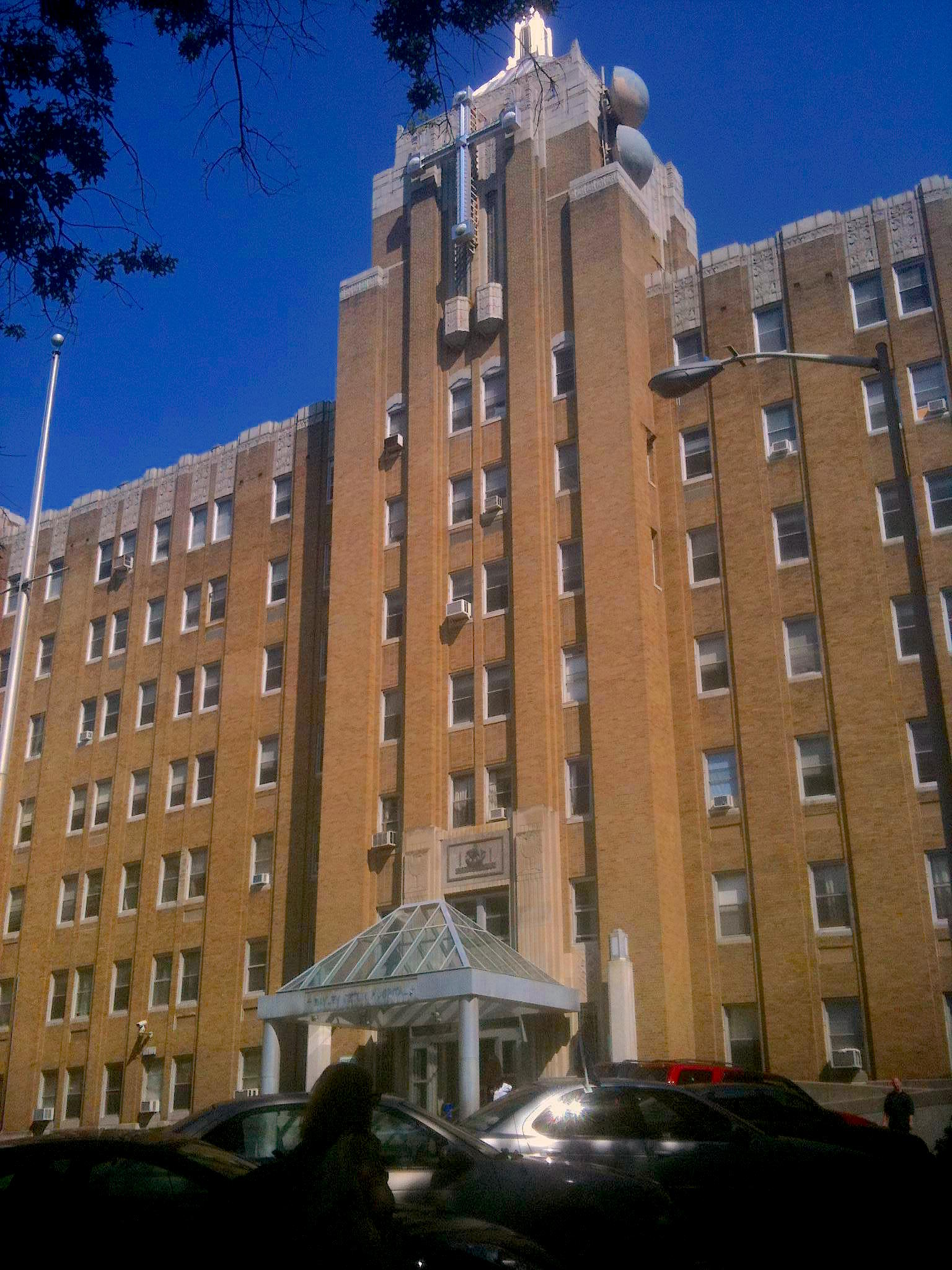
Facade of the main building constructed in the 1930s, pictured in 2011

In the 1930s, President Franklin Roosevelt began a campaign to construct and maintain U.S. Public Health Service Hospitals, to serve the military, veterans, and the general public. As part of this process, the current main building of Bayley Seton was constructed. The Staten Island Public Health Service Hospital was built as a five- to seven-story hospital, in a Mayan revival style. Until 1981, it operated inpatient and outpatient services, emergency, surgery, and rehabilitation wards. Military installations at Fort Wadsworth, Fort Hamilton (just across the narrows in Brooklyn), the Staten Island Homeport, Miller Field Air Station, as well as air, naval and Coast Guard installations built during the Second World War assured a large military and veteran population for the hospital.

In 1980, President Ronald Reagan announced plans to close or sell all such hospitals, and despite local protest, Staten Island Public Health Service Hospital was sold to the Sisters of Charity of New York, a Catholic medical and social services system.

=== Bayley Seton ===
The Sisters of Charity renamed the hospital Bayley Seton, after their order's founder, Elizabeth Ann Seton. The renamed hospital expanded its campus buildings to include the Saint Elizabeth Ann outpatient clinics, and turned over part of the campus to the New York Foundling Hospital.

In the 1990s Amethyst House, a women's Drug Abuse Treatment center was opened, as well as an Alcoholism Acute Care Unit on the 3rd floor, a St. Vincent's Nursing School on the fifth floor, social service agencies in other buildings, including the Richmond Center for Rehab & Specialty Care Center, hospital inpatient drug rehab treatment services, services for co-occurring mental and substance abuse disorders, a comprehensive psychiatric emergency program), and the center for a mental health client dispersed housing and in-community employment program.

==== Saint Vincent's ====
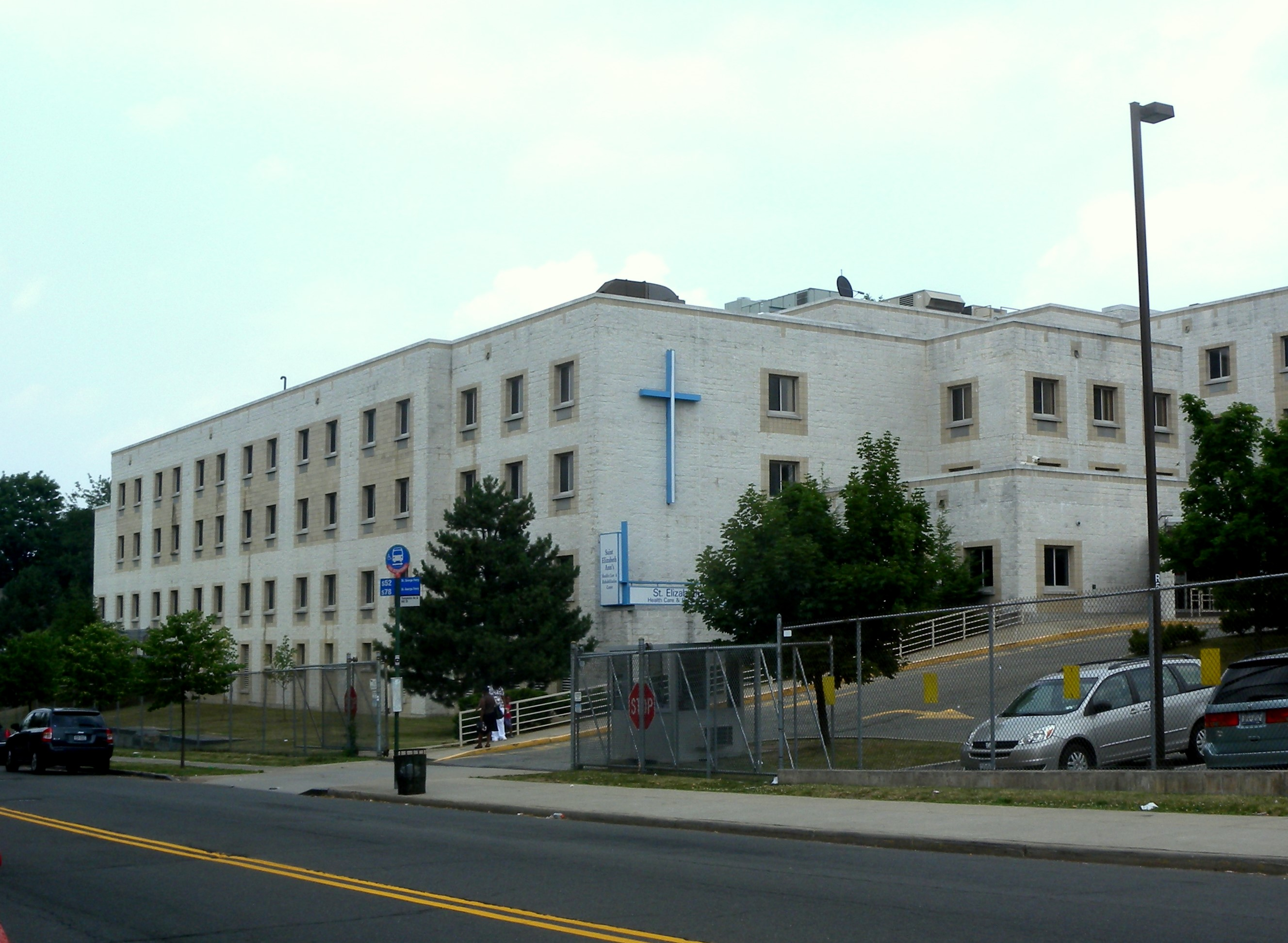
Richmond Center for Rehab & Specialty Care Center

In 2000, Sisters of Charity turned over Bayley Seton (along with their main Staten Island hospital) to Saint Vincent's Catholic Medical Center, which already included the Sisters' Manhattan and Westchester County hospitals, to create Saint Vincent's Catholic Medical Centers New York. Facing financial difficulties almost immediately, Bayley saw around half its services closed, including its emergency room, pharmacy, surgery, and most medical clinics.

After filing for bankruptcy in 2003, Saint Vincent's spun off or closed almost half its sites, including selling another hospital on Bard Avenue to Bayonne Medical Center, becoming Richmond University Medical Center (RUMC) in 2007. Most psychiatric and addiction services were retained, as were outpatient clinics for geriatrics, patients with HIV infection, military and family health services, and mother and baby care. As of 2004, the hospital employed approximately 550 staff, just more than half the 990 employed in 2000; and as of 2007 there were an estimated 1,500 patients who used the Bayley Seton facilities regularly,

At the beginning of 2008, Saint Vincent's Catholic Medical Centers and RUMC negotiated a deal to share Bayley Seton. In April 2008, RUMC closed its adult and pediatric clinics and HIV/AIDS center at Bayley Seton. Six smaller buildings were closed and staff consolidated.

In 2008, the Salvation Army purchased a seven-acre L-shaped portion of the Bayley campus with plans to build a recreation center to be called the Kroc Center, as well as an option to purchase the remaining land including the main hospital and transform it into affordable senior housing. However, the organization failed to raise funds for the project. Buildings on that portion of the campus were demolished in 2018.

==== Centers Plan for Healthy Living ====
Starting in 2012, the building was used by Centers Plan for Healthy Living, a home health insurance company. On December 31, 2024, the company merged with Elevance Health.

From 2014 to 2019, the TV series Gotham used the hospital as a setting for interior and exterior scenes set in Arkham Asylum. The Amazon series Hunters and Fallout also used the campus for filming. Many films have shot on the campus including The Adjustment Bureau, Salt, Terrifier 2 and the locally shot comedy Abnormal Attraction starring Malcolm McDowell, Bruce Davison, Gilbert Gottfried, and Leslie Easterbrook.

As of 2020, the main hospital building was still in operation at reduced capacity.
