= Richmond University Medical Center =

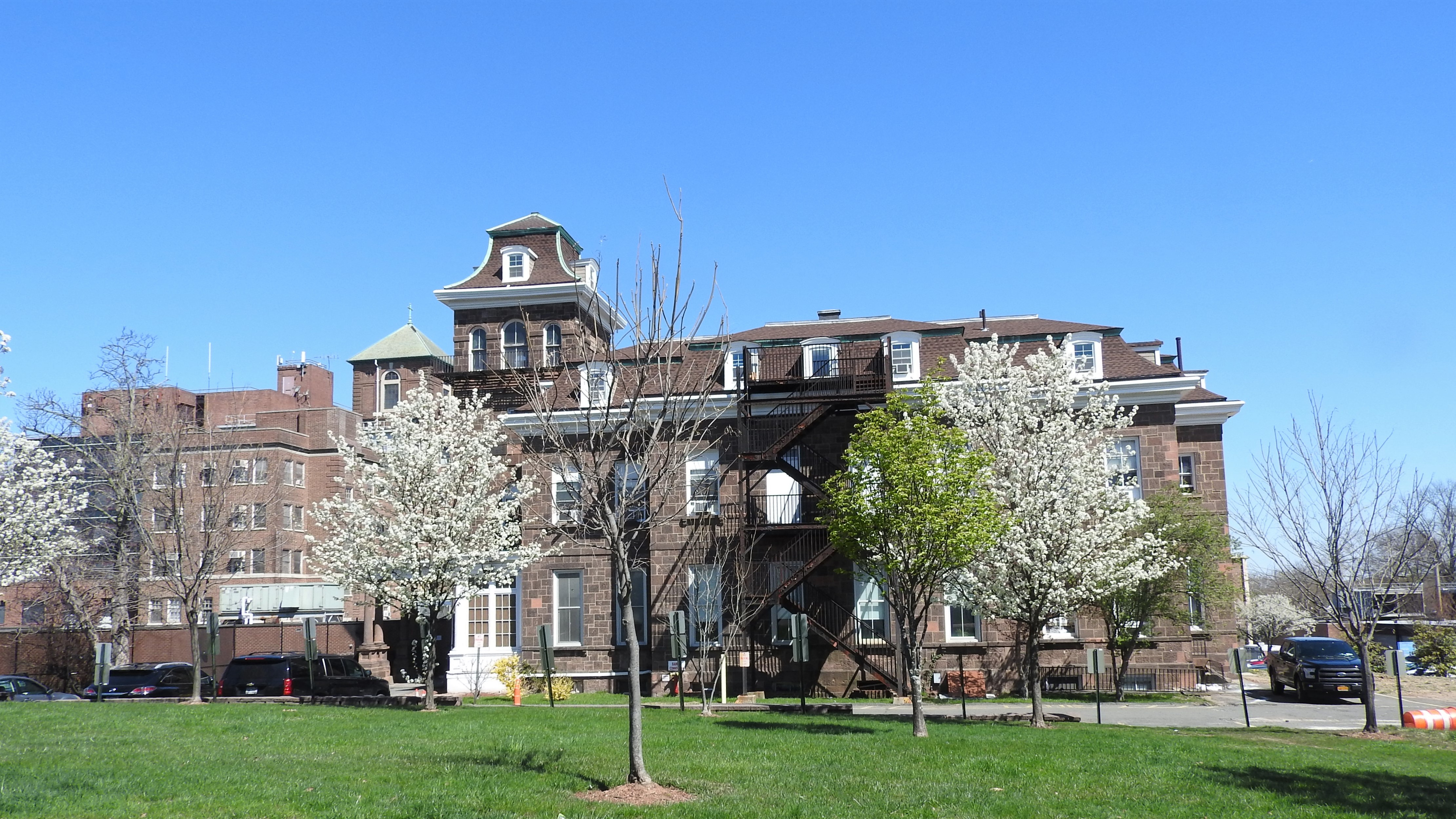

Geography
- Location: 355 Bard Ave, Staten Island, New York, United States
- Coordinates: 40°38′08″N 74°06′22″W

Organization
- Affiliated university: Icahn School of Medicine at Mount Sinai
- Network: Mount Sinai Health System

Services
- Emergency department: Level I Adult Trauma Center / Level II Pediatric Trauma Center
- Beds: 448

History
- Founded: 1903

Links
- Website: www.rumcsi.org
- Lists: Hospitals in New York State
- Other links: Hospitals in Staten Island

Richmond University Medical Center is a hospital in West New Brighton, Staten Island, New York City. The hospital occupies the buildings that were formerly St. Vincent's Medical Center, which closed in 2006. It is affiliated with the Icahn School of Medicine at Mount Sinai and the Mount Sinai Health System but is not a member of the health system.

== History ==
Richmond University Medical Center was established on January 1, 2007. It is a Level I Trauma Center located in Staten Island, New York. The original hospital on the site, St. Vincent's Hospital, was opened in 1903 as a 74-bed facility under the direction of the Sisters of Charity of New York in what had been the Garner mansion, a mansard-roofed stone building built by Charles Taber and later owned by W.T. Garner (the building had been offered to ex-President Ulysses S. Grant as a retirement home, but Grant and his wife were reportedly put off by a summer swarm of mosquitoes).

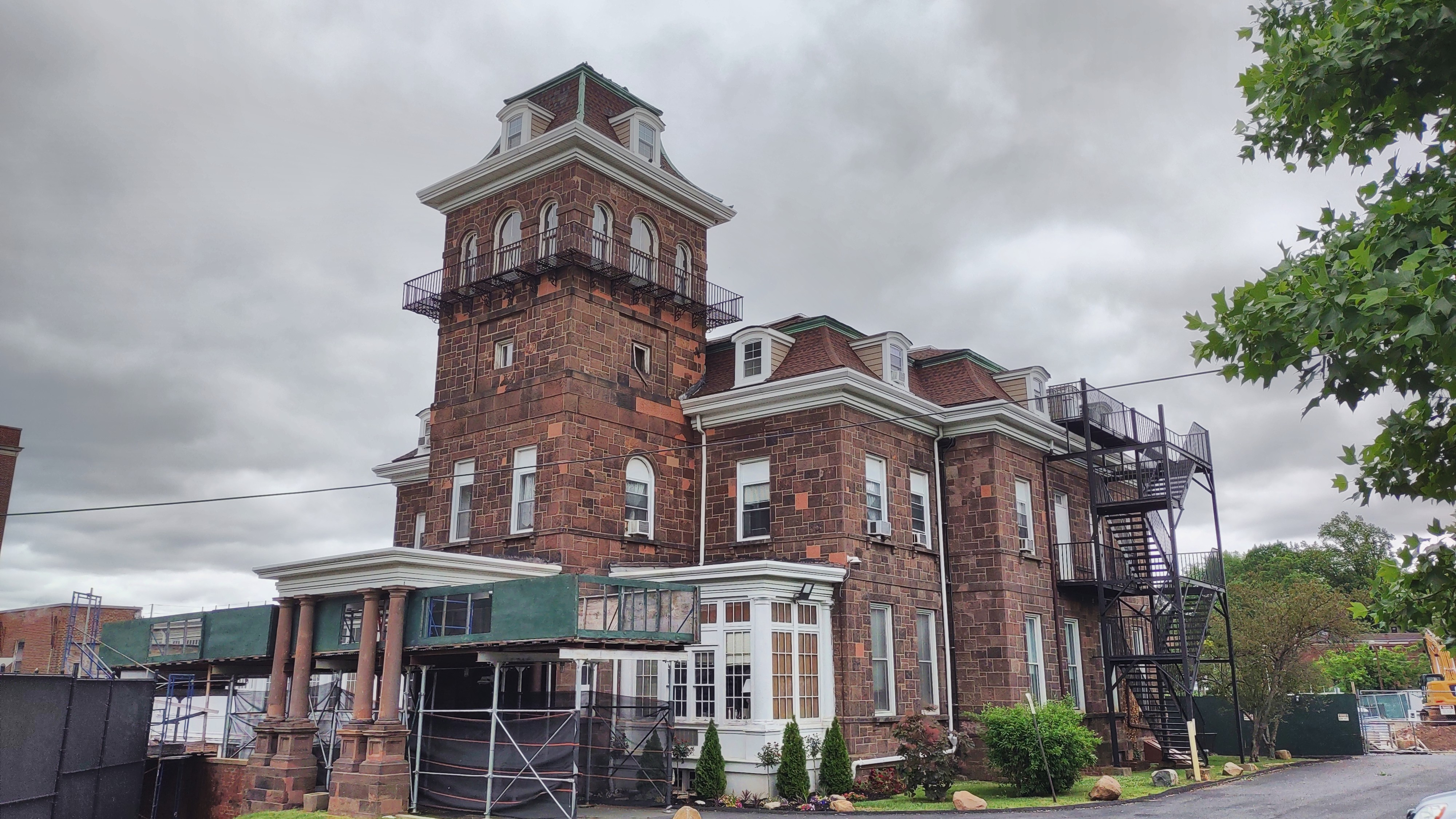
Garner mansion

The mansion still stands on the grounds. The hospital greatly expanded and modernized over the years, and the Sisters of Charity Healthcare System expanded to acquire the former U.S. Public Health Service Hospital in the Stapleton neighborhood of Staten Island, renaming it Bayley Seton Hospital. In 1999 Saint Vincent's Catholic Medical Center of Manhattan, originally a separate institution founded by the same sisters, took control of the facility as part of a major restructuring of the overall community of Catholic healthcare facilities in New York.

In 2006, St. Vincent's on Staten Island was sold to Bayonne Medical Center and spun off as Richmond University Medical Center (RUMC).

Although largely non-religiously affiliated, a cross that adorned St. Vincent's Hospital, on its main building, remains; another cross, on the Villa Building, has been removed.

== Campuses ==
- 355 Bard Avenue, Staten Island, New York 10310 (West Brighton)
- 75 Vanderbilt Avenue, Staten Island, New York 10304 (Stapleton)

== Number of beds ==
The hospital is licensed to operate 448 beds.

- Bed Type #
- Alcohol Detoxification - 7
- Coronary Care - 10
- Intensive Care - 20
- Maternity - 34
- Medical-Surgical - 291
- Neonatal Continuing Care - 6
- Neonatal Intensive Care - 8
- Neonatal Intermediate Care - 11
- Pediatric - 23
- Pediatric Intensive Care Unit - 3
- Psychiatric - 35

== Ownership ==
- Sisters of Charity Healthcare (1903–1999)
- Saint Vincent's Catholic Medical Center (1999–2007)
- Richmond University Medical Center (2007–present)
