= Ransdell Act =

US law

- Long title: An Act to establish and operate a National Institute of Health, to create a system of fellowships in said institute, and to authorize the Government to accept donations for use in ascertaining the cause, prevention, and cure of disease affecting human beings, and for other purposes.
- Enacted by: the 71st United States Congress
- Effective: May 26, 1930

Citations
- Public law: 71-251
- Statutes at Large: 46 Stat. 379, Chapter 320

Codification
- Acts repealed: 42 USC § 17-25e, July 1, 1944
- Titles amended: 42: Public Health and Social Welfare
- U.S.C. sections created: Chapter 1 § 23a

Legislative history
- Introduced in the Senate as S. 1171 by Joseph E. Ransdell (D–LA) on April 21, 1930; Committee consideration by Committee on Interstate and Foreign Commerce; Signed into law by President Herbert Hoover on May 26, 1930

The Ransdell Act (ch. 251, Pub. L. 71–251, 46 Stat. 379, enacted May 26, 1930, codified as amended at 42 U.S.C. § 21, 42 U.S.C. § 22, 42 U.S.C. §§ 23a–23g), reorganized, expanded and redesignated the Laboratory of Hygiene (created in 1887) as the National Institute of Health.

Congress appropriated $750,000 in the bill for construction of facilities and research fellowships. The NIH grew into today's 27-unit National Institutes of Health).

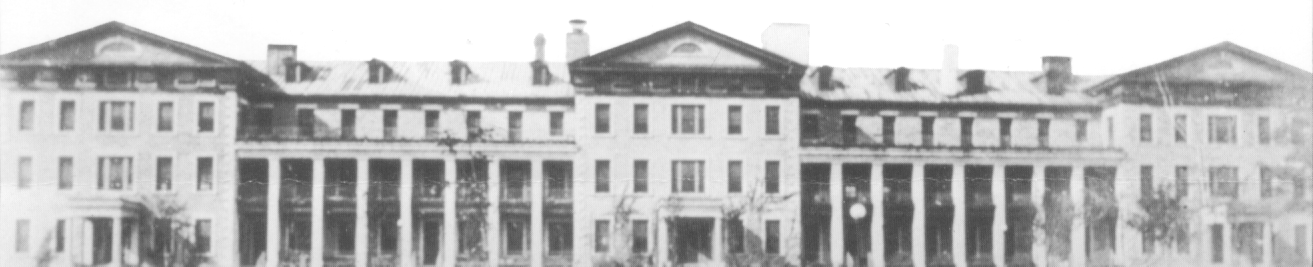
Marine Hospital on Staten Island - home of the Laboratory of Hygiene from 1887-91. Today the building is part of Bayley Seton Hospital

The Ransdell Act was sponsored by and named for Joseph E. Ransdell, a United States senator for the state of Louisiana.
