= Doctors' Hospital (Staten Island) =

Coordinates: 40°36′10″N 74°5′31″W

Geography
- Location: Concord, New York, United States

History
- Former name: Sunnyside Hospital
- Opened: 1940
- Closed: 2003

Links
- Lists: Hospitals in New York State

Doctors' Hospital of Staten Island was a for-profit hospital located in the Concord section of the Staten Island borough of New York City, New York. Founded as Sunnyside Hospital in 1940, it was closed in 2003 and later demolished.

== History ==
Founded as Sunnyside Hospital on Little Clove Road in 1940, it moved to 1050 Targee Street in Concord in 1962–1963 after its original building was demolished to make way for the Staten Island Expressway, part of Interstate 278. The 71-bed hospital was closed in 2003 after a merger with Staten Island University Hospital. The building was demolished and Public School 48 opened on the location in September 2013.
