= Saint Vincent's Catholic Medical Centers =

Former healthcare system in New York, United States

Coordinates: 40.736416°N 73.999588°W

Saint Vincent Catholic Medical Centers
- Sisters of Charity

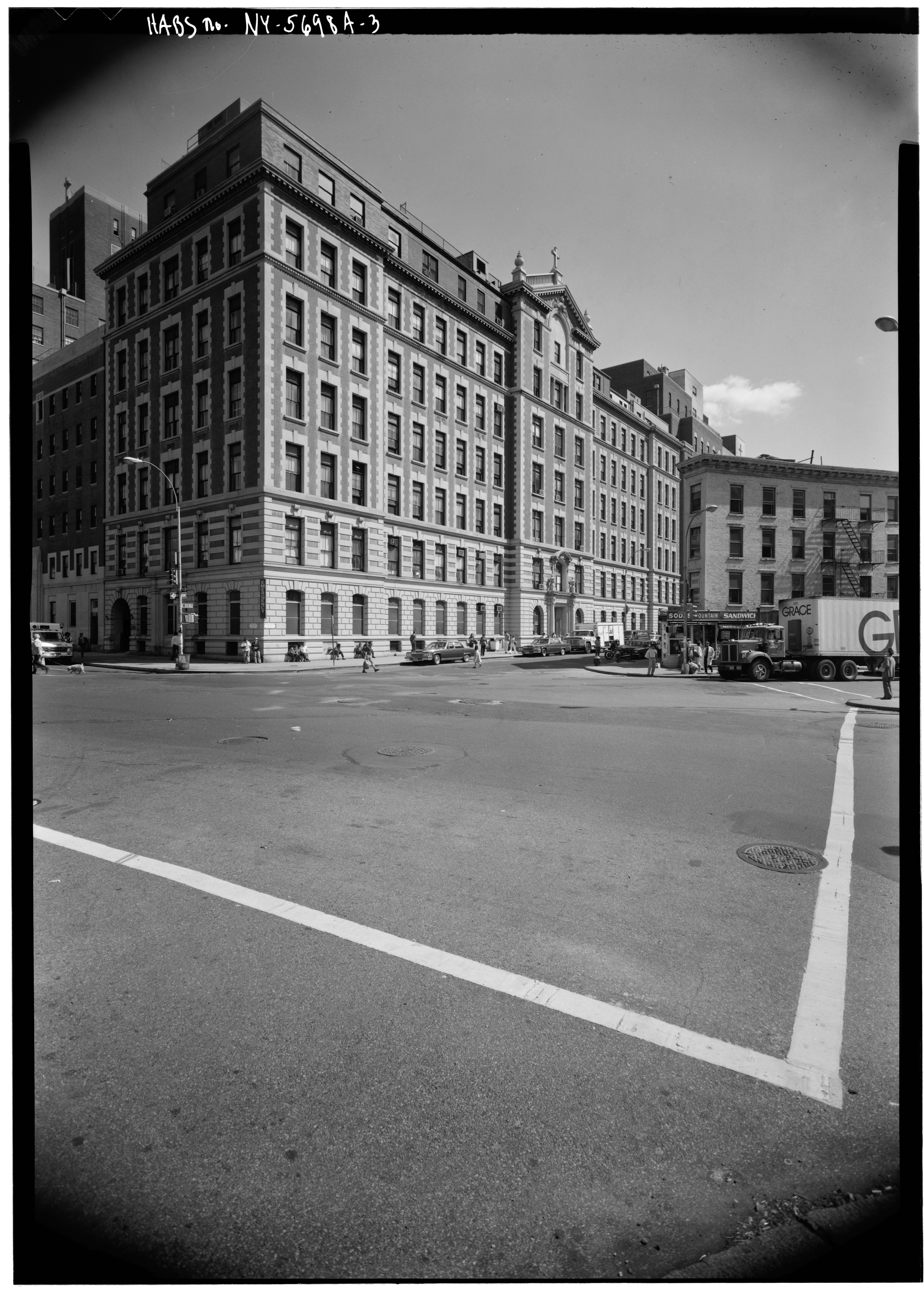
- Elizabeth Seton Building at 151-167 West 11th St

Geography
- Location: New York metropolitan area, New York City, New York, U.S.

Organisation
- Care system: Catholic
- Type: General and Teaching
- Affiliated university: New York Medical College College of Mount Saint Vincent

Services
- Emergency department: Previously Level 1, now Closed
- Beds: 758 (Manhattan Site)

History
- Founded: 1849
- Closed: 2010

Links
- Website: svcmc.org
- Lists: Hospitals in U.S.
- Other links: Hospitals in Manhattan

Saint Vincent's Catholic Medical Centers (also known as Saint Vincent's or SVCMC) was a healthcare system in New York City, anchored by its flagship hospital, St. Vincent's Hospital Manhattan.

St. Vincent's was founded in 1849 and was a major teaching hospital in the Greenwich Village neighborhood of Manhattan, New York City. It closed on April 30, 2010. Demolition began at the end of 2012 and was completed in early 2013. Other hospital buildings were converted into luxury condos and a new luxury building, Greenwich Lane, has replaced the St. Vincent's building.

== History ==
=== Operation ===
For more than 150 years, St. Vincent's Hospital served a wide range of New Yorkers, especially in its neighborhood of Greenwich Village, including poets, writers, artists, homeless people, the poor and the working class. It treated victims of the cholera epidemic of 1849 and of the Hudson River landing of US Airways Flight 1549 in 2009. It was the designated provider for New York and New Jersey members of the U.S. Department of Defense Health Plan. Over time it expanded to become a major medical and research center. It maintained its connection to the Roman Catholic tradition, and was sponsored by the Bishop of Brooklyn and the President of the Sisters of Charity of New York.

==== 19th century ====
St. Vincent's was the third oldest hospital in New York City after The New York Hospital and Bellevue Hospital. It was founded as a medical facility in 1849 and named for St. Vincent de Paul, a seventeenth-century French priest, whose religious congregation of the Daughters of Charity inspired the founding in Maryland in 1809 of the Sisters of Charity by St. Elizabeth Ann Seton, a native New Yorker and Roman Catholic convert. St. Vincent de Paul is the patron saint of charitable societies.

In 1817, four Sisters of Charity from Emmitsburg, Maryland at the request of Bishop John Connolly established an orphanage in New York. As the congregation grew the sisters opened more orphanages and began to staff parochial schools. In 1846, the Sisters in New York incorporated as a separate entity from the Sisters of Charity based in Maryland. They set up a charity hospital to meet the demands of the poor and disadvantaged. It began as a thirty-bed hospital in a small brick house on East 13th Street. St. Vincent's served the poor as one of the few charity hospitals in New York City. The hospital opened on November 1, 1849, during a cholera epidemic under the direction of Sister M. Angela Hughes, sister of Bishop John Hughes. With almost every room occupied by patients, the sisters ate, slept, and rested in a single room or had their beds at the ends of the halls. A typhoid epidemic in 1852, filled the hospital to capacity. After outgrowing those quarters in 1856, the sisters moved to a former orphanage at the then undeveloped corner of West 11th Street and Seventh Avenue. In 1859, a fair was held at the New York Crystal Palace to raise funds to renovate the former orphanage and erect two additional wings.

In 1870, the hospital introduced its first horse-drawn ambulance. In October 1892, it launched its School of Nursing.

The Sisters admitted patients regardless of religion or ability to pay. The doctors from Bellevue Hospital worked at the hospital. St. Vincent's also operated a soup kitchen. According to an 1892 New York Times article, St. Vincent's was distinguished from other hospitals in the city by now for its large number of tramps and other destitute persons". The poet Edna St. Vincent Millay got her middle name from the hospital, where her uncle's life was saved in 1892 after he was accidentally locked in the hold of a ship for several days without food or water.

==== 20th century ====
The school received its certification from the Board of Regents of the University of the State of New York in 1905, one of the first such schools to be so recognized. In 1911, St. Vincent's Ambulance, manned by hospital interns, responded to the Triangle Shirtwaist Factory fire in Manhattan, where the attendants watched helplessly as those trapped in the fire jumped to their deaths onto the street below. In 1912, St. Vincent's received and treated victims after the sinking of the RMS Titanic, while mourning the loss of chief surgeon William O'Loughlin, who died in the disaster. A plaque honoring his memory stood in the hospital's main entrance as a reminder of his dedication and sacrifice.

In 1968, under William Grace, Director of Medicine at St. Vincent's, and his associate John A. Chadbourn, the hospital established the nation's first Mobile Coronary Care Unit (MCCU) following an example in Ireland. It was configured on a white over red 1968 Chevrolet Step-Van and utilized a portable battery-powered defibrillator/monitor; a battery-powered electrocardiograph, I.V. kit, resuscitation/oxygen kit, and a drug kit. The success of the St. Vincent's MCCU project inspired the development of the "HeartMobile" in Columbus, Ohio and similar programs in Marietta, Georgia, Montgomery County, Maryland, and Los Angeles in 1970.

In 1975, the Puerto Rican extremist nationalist group FALN bombed Fraunces Tavern in the Wall Street area. St. Vincent's paramedics and responders from multiple other EMS agencies transported patients to St. Vincent's Hospital for trauma care.

In the 1980s, as the gay population of Greenwich Village and New York began succumbing to the AIDS virus, St. Vincent's established the first AIDS ward on the East Coast and second only to one in San Francisco, and became "Ground Zero" for the AIDS-afflicted in NYC. The hospital "became synonymous" with care for AIDS patients in the 1980s, particularly poor gay men and drug users. It became one of the best hospitals in the state for AIDS care with a large research facility and dozens of doctors and nurses working on it.

ACT UP protested at the hospital one night in the 1980s due to its Catholic nature. They took over the emergency room and covered crucifixes with condoms intending to raise awareness and to offend Catholics. Instead of pressing charges, the sisters who ran the hospital decided to meet with the protesters to better understand their concerns.

One of the great physicians at the hospital was Dr. Ronald Ollstein. He pioneered burn surgery in New York City. First at Harlem Hospital and then at St. Vincent's. He was known for his famous original surgical knot, dubbed The Ollstein "O". He died of cancer.

==== 21st century ====
The SVCMC network was formed in 2000, when St. Vincent's Hospital in Manhattan, formerly the St. Vincent Hospital and Medical Center of New York, merged with the Catholic Medical Centers of Brooklyn and Queens and Sisters of Charity Healthcare on Staten Island, which included St. Vincent's Hospital (Staten Island), Mary Immaculate Hospital in Queens, St. John's Queens Hospital, Saint Joseph's Hospital in Queens, St. Mary's Hospital of Brooklyn, and Bayley Seton Hospital in Staten Island. The mergers were intended to reduce costs by improved efficiency and elimination reductant administration, however, it also brought increased debt with the member hospitals.

St. Vincent's was the primary admitting hospital for those injured in the September 11 attacks on the World Trade Center. A physician who worked at St. Vincent's, Sneha Ann Philip, was declared missing on September 10, and later declared as the 2,751st victim of the collapse of the towers. Pictures of the missing collected in such large numbers that the hospital dedicated an entire outside wall to protect them. The Wall of Hope and Remembrance was maintained for years.

Many of the hospitals closed after September 2001. In 2003 St. Clare's Hospital became an affiliate and was renamed St. Vincent's Hospital (Midtown), but it closed on August 1, 2007. St. Mary's Hospital of Brooklyn closed on September 23, 2005; Mary Immaculate and St. John's closed on March 1, 2009, after being sold to Wyckoff Heights Medical Center in 2006.

=== Closing ===
In 2005, under financial pressure from its charity involvements and rising costs, the SVCMC system filed for bankruptcy. The system launched an aggressive reorganization effort, selling or transferring its money-losing facilities and focusing development on its main hospital, which allowed it to emerge from bankruptcy in the summer of 2007. In the name of modernizing and restructuring, it also announced plans to build a new Manhattan hospital across the street, with a planned opening set for 2011. Part of the redevelopment was to include construction of a billion-dollar residential condominium by the Rudin real estate family. The plan was a source of contention with several neighborhood groups, such as the Greenwich Village Society for Historic Preservation and the Municipal Art Society. The Landmarks Preservation Commission approved the residential components of the plan in July 2009, but by then residential development financing was no longer available because of the Great Recession.

The New York State Department of Health has said there was no need for an acute care hospital in Greenwich Village.

St. Vincent's announced on January 27, 2010, that its financial situation had soured further and desperate measures would be required to keep the hospital open. Senators, city council members and congressional representatives all became involved in attempting to save the hospital. A Greater New York Hospital Association spokesman pointed to health budget cuts in Albany. The hospital began discussions with Continuum Health Partners (the parent corporation of Beth Israel Medical Center, St. Luke's-Roosevelt Hospital Center, and New York Eye and Ear Infirmary) and with Mount Sinai Hospital to consider taking ownership of the hospital but both declined.

On April 6, 2010, the board of directors voted to close inpatient care services at St. Vincent's Catholic Medical Center, and to sell its outpatient services to other systems. The emergency room stopped accepting ambulances on April 9, 2010, and delivered its last baby on April 15, 2010. On April 19, 2010, more than 1,000 staff, representing approximately one-third of the hospital workforce, received notice of lay-off. On April 14, 2010, St. Vincent's Hospital Manhattan filed for Chapter 11 bankruptcy protection. The petition, filed in Federal District Court in Manhattan, showed liabilities of more than $1 billion. Saint Vincent's largest unsecured creditor was the PBGC which is a federal pension insurance agency that was insuring the "Saint Vincent Catholic Medical Centers Retirement Plan" which was a defined benefit pension plan. The pension plan on September 14, 2010, which was the date of termination for the plan had 9581 participants.

On April 30, 2010, the emergency room at St. Vincent's closed, officially shuttering the hospital after 161 years. Hospital administrators said that the vote to close came after a six-month-long effort to save the financially troubled institution, but August 21, 2011, prosecutors with the Manhattan District Attorney's Office were reported to have launched an investigation to determine whether administrators intentionally ran St. Vincent's into the ground. The remaining parts of Saint Vincent Catholic Medical Centers including its nursing homes, home health agency, St. Vincent's Hospital Westchester, and U.S. Family Health Plan, were to continue to operate without interruption, but these entities were sold to other providers' systems.

==== Post-closure ====
In October 2011, the former main campus at 7-15 Seventh Avenue was sold to Rudin Management Company for $260 million. CBRE Group represented the seller, Saint Vincent's Catholic Medical Centers of New York. Eyal Ofer's Global Holdings assisted the buyer in the sale.

At the time of its closure, St. Vincent's occupied a large real-estate footprint in Greenwich Village; it consisted of several hospital buildings and a number of outpatient facilities, had more than 1,000 affiliated physicians, including 70 full-time and 300 voluntary attending physicians, and trained more than 300 residents and fellows annually. As a Catholic hospital, St. Vincent's was officially sponsored by the Sisters of Charity and the Roman Catholic Diocese of Brooklyn. St. Vincent's was the last Catholic general hospital in New York City. The St. Vincent de Paul stained glass window from the hospital was donated to St. Joseph's Regional Medical Center in Paterson, New Jersey in honor of its legacy of charity. It is on display in the main lobby of the medical center.

The building was demolished by early 2013. New York City announced a deal which preserves a historic building and creates a new school on the site. Former City Council Speaker Christine Quinn said that the plan also calls for a reduction in the number of new apartments, funds for affordable housing and arts education in local schools.

== Medical education ==
SVCMC served as one of two academic medical centers of New York Medical College. It offered a residency and fellowship program, and also served as a clerkship facility for students of medicine, nursing, physical therapy, and occupational therapy:

Residencies
Anesthesiology, internal medicine, pediatrics, family practice, combined internal medicine & pediatrics, primary care, neurology, neurosurgery, nuclear medicine, obstetrics and gynecology, ophthalmology, orthopedics, pathology, PM&R, psychiatry, child psychiatry, radiology, general surgery, transitional
Fellowships
Cardiology, critical care, endocrinology, gastroenterology, interventional endoscopy, geriatrics, hematology/oncology, infectious disease, pulmonary
Allied health programs
CPR, advanced life support, EMT, paramedics, nuclear medicine technology

Medical staff residency training records and verifications have become available through the Federation Credentials Verification Service (FCVS) Closed Residency program records.

== Former facilities ==
=== St. Vincent's Hospital, Manhattan ===
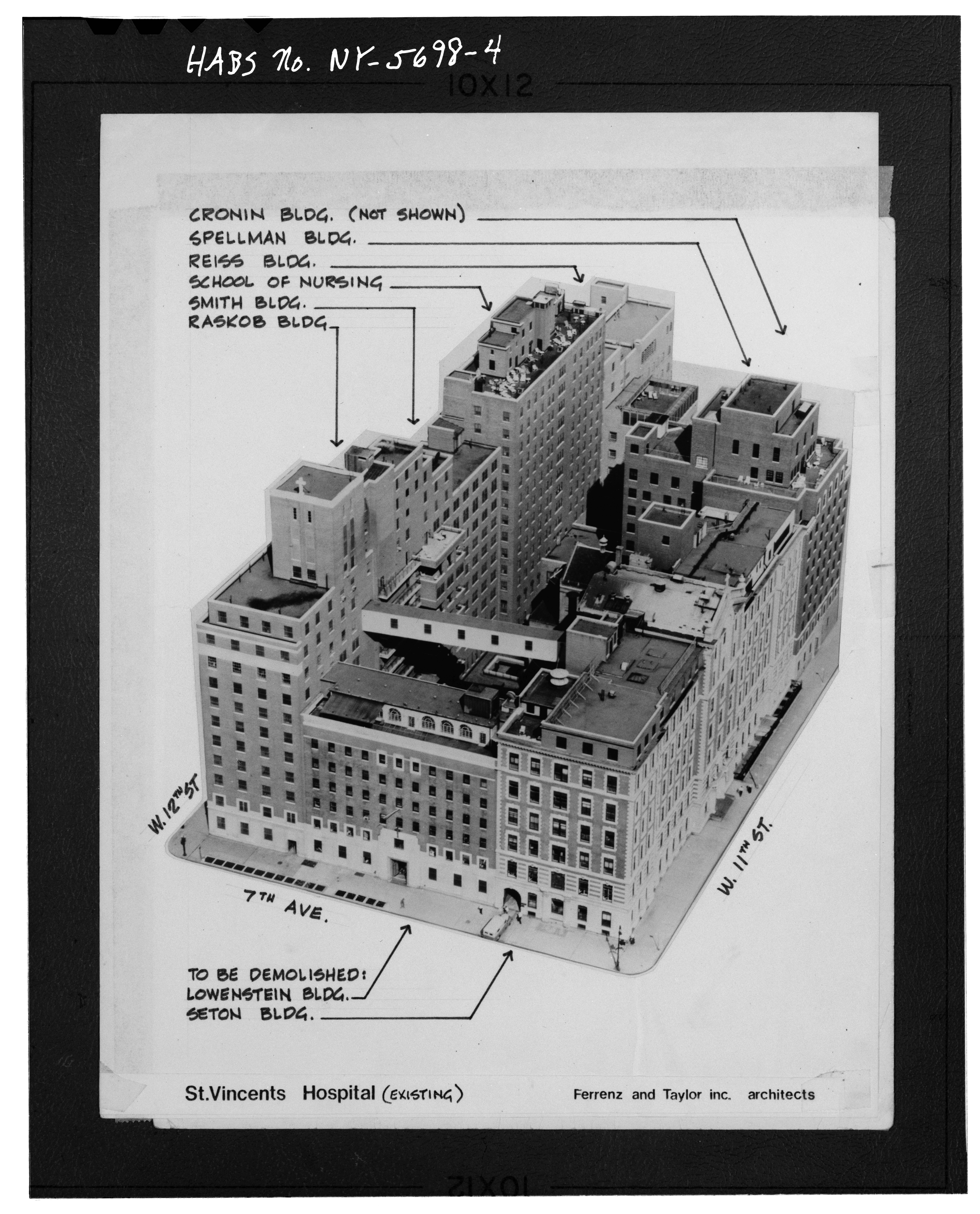
The Manhattan complex in 1979

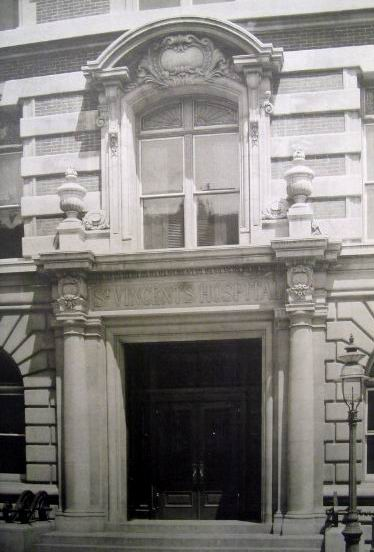
The main entrance of St. Vincent's Hospital (1900), Greenwich Village, New York City

St. Vincent's Hospital was a 758-bed tertiary care teaching hospital, at Seventh Avenue and Greenwich Avenue on the border of Greenwich Village and Chelsea. It included:

- Level I Trauma Center and Critical Care Center
- Comprehensive Cardiovascular Center
- Level III Neonatal ICU
- The Pancreas & Biliary Center
- Comprehensive Cancer Center (now Beth Israel Comprehensive Cancer Center West Side Campus)
- Comprehensive HIV Center
- Full service emergency department
- Inpatient and outpatient psychiatric and addiction services

=== Other ===
- St. Vincent's Hospital (Westchester), a 138-bed behavioral health facility, Harrison, NY (now part of St. Joseph's Medical Center, Yonkers), including:
  - Behavior Health Residential Services, a 500-bed community housing and case management program based at Bayley Seton Staten Island, with units in the five boroughs and Westchester
- Four skilled nursing facilities including:
  - Bishop Mugavero Center for Geriatric Care, Brooklyn
  - Holy Family Home, Brooklyn
  - St. Elizabeth Ann's Health Care & Rehabilitation Center, Staten Island
  - Monsignor Fitzpatrick, Queens
- Pax Christi Hospice, Staten Island
- The Edward and Theresa O’Toole Medical Services Building, now Lenox Health Greenwich Village
- SVCMC Home Health Agency, a comprehensive home care agency serving all five boroughs of New York City
- Kennedy Medical Offices, a 24/7 urgent care and multi-speciality center located at JFK International Airport. The center was over 23,000 square feet and offered primary care, urgent care, occupational health services, radiology, orthopedics, optometry, psychology, physical & occupational therapy, pain management and other services. Kennedy Medical staff also provided 24/7 paramedic New York state-certified first responder services to the Port Authority to supplement the PA Police EMS division. Kennedy Medical Offices treated dignitaries, politicians, Hollywood stars, and VIP's from around the world (including security details for the President of the U.S. and the Pope as well as heads of many other nations).
- Several outpatient medical and substance abuse treatment centers in Manhattan, Brooklyn, Westchester, and the Bronx.

== Notable programs ==
=== St. Vincent's HIV Center ===
St. Vincent's was the epicenter of New York City's AIDS epidemic. It housed the first and largest AIDS ward on the east coast and is often referred to as the "ground zero" of the AIDS epidemic.

As one of the first institutions to address and treat HIV and AIDS in the 1980s, St. Vincent's HIV Center was one of the oldest, most experienced and most renowned HIV treatment programs in the US. It provided coordinated outpatient and inpatient primary care and case management services to HIV-positive adults, pregnant women, and children, and also provided HIV prevention services, AIDS education programs, HIV clinical research, and support groups. In addition, SVCMC developed the unique Airbridge Project, which coordinates care for HIV-positive patients who make frequent trips to Puerto Rico. Father Mychal Judge ministered to Catholics dying of AIDS in the early years of the epidemic. Tony Kushner features the hospital in his play Angels in America, and it is also alluded to by Larry Kramer in his play The Normal Heart.

=== Chinese Outreach Program ===
Due to its proximity to Chinatown, Manhattan, two miles away, SVCMC had close ties to the Chinese community throughout its history. In an effort to reach this underserved population, the hospital opened an independent Chinese-speaking inpatient unit, which employed physicians and nurses who spoke Cantonese and Mandarin. They also opened an outpatient facility in Chinatown, provided a free shuttle service from Chinatown to the hospital, and offered Chinese-focused healthcare services such as Acupuncture and Chinese traditional meals.

=== Cystic Fibrosis Program ===
Saint Vincent's Cystic Fibrosis therapy program offered care for patients with cystic fibrosis.

=== Perinatal Hospice Center ===
The Perinatal Hospice was founded in 2007 to meet the needs of parents who have discovered early in pregnancy that their baby is nonviable outside the womb, and yet chose to carry their baby to term.

=== John J. Conley Department of Ethics ===
Closely linked to the Bioethics Institute at New York Medical College, The Conley Ethics Department was a leader in the study of clinical medical ethics and spirituality in healthcare. Chaired by Dr. Daniel Sulmasy, the department endeavored to integrate the biopsychosocial model of healthcare within the SVCMC system.

=== Elizabeth Ann Seton Chapel ===
Because the hospital was founded and manned through much of its history by nuns, its hospital chapel was a primary focus of the hospital architecture, and was symbolically nested at the very center of the hospital. The chapel, named for St. Elizabeth Ann Seton, offered daily Mass and refuge for patients and hospital staff.

=== Hospital Pet Care Program ===
Responding to the unique needs of an urban population, SVCMC instituted a program to help patients provide for their pets during their stay in the hospital. Animals were walked or fed in a patient's home, or were relocated to care facilities or short-term foster homes.

=== Comprehensive Cancer Center ===
The Comprehensive Cancer Center provided prevention, diagnosis, treatment and recovery of a variety of malignancies, with a focus on preventing inpatient stays through careful outpatient monitoring. Surgery, chemotherapy, radiation, and stem cell transplants were provided as day procedures along with 24-hour emergency care.

== See also ==
- St. Vincent (musician)
