= St. John's Guild Seaside Hospital =

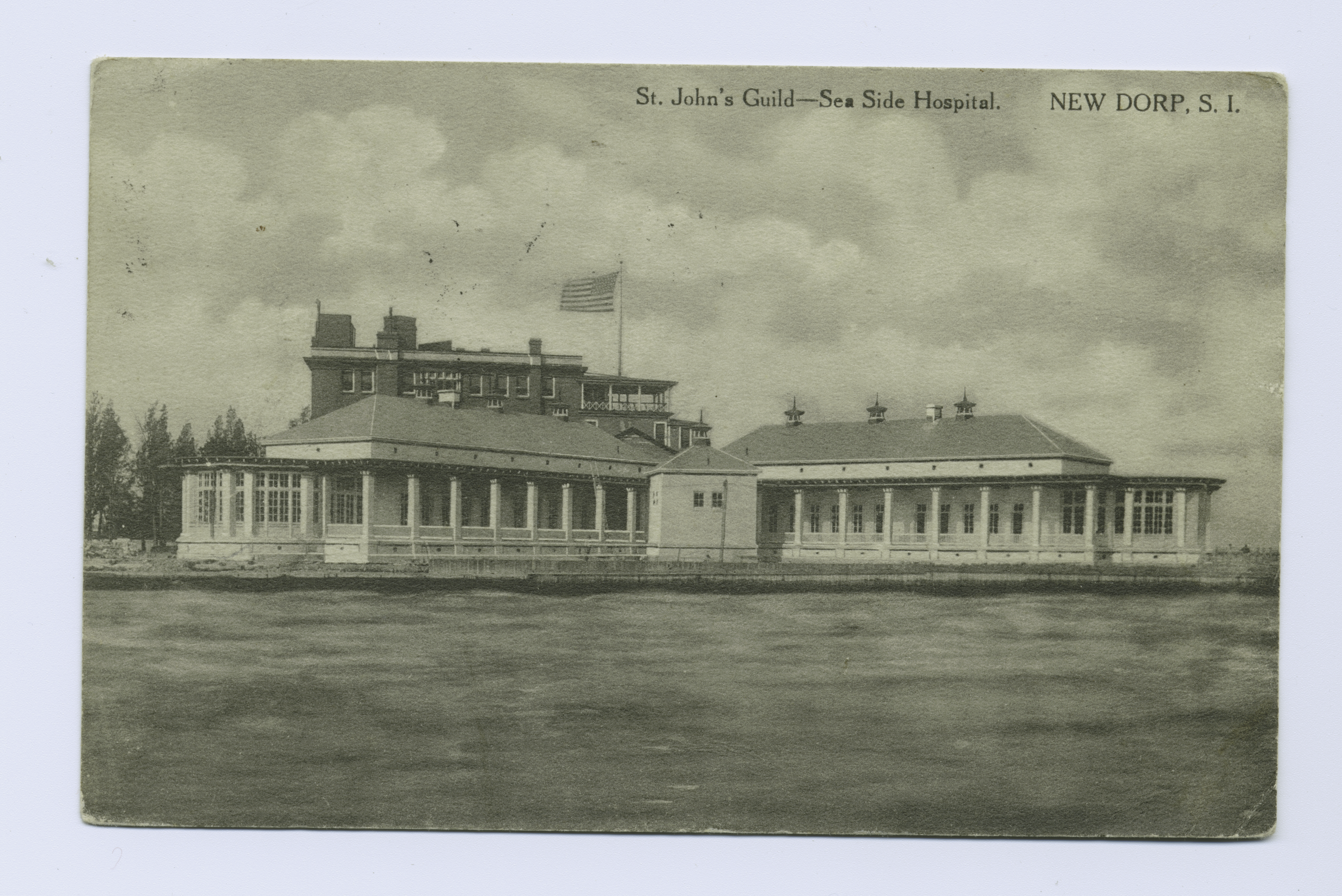
- The hospital in the early 1900s

Geography
- Location: Staten Island, New York, United States
- Coordinates: 40°33′35″N 74°05′57″W

History
- Opened: 1898
- Closed: 1951
- Demolished: after 1951

Links
- Lists: Hospitals in New York State
- Other links: List of hospitals in Staten Island

St. John's Guild Seaside Hospital began with an 1879 land purchase of 10 acres on the shore of the Atlantic Ocean in New Dorp and ended after the hospital was sold in 1951 and subsequently demolished.

== History ==
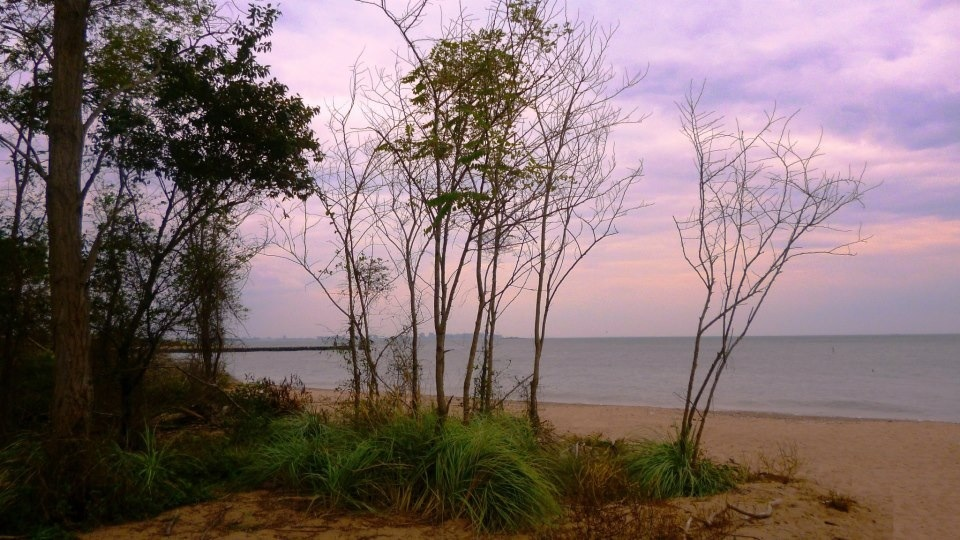
New Dorp Beach (2012), where 14 acres were purchased in 1879 for building the hospital

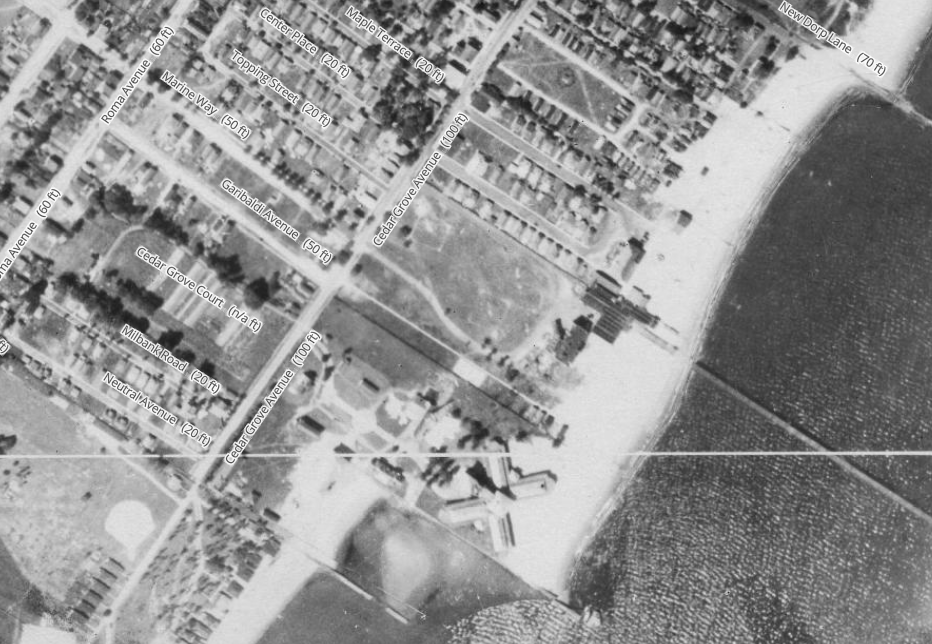
Aerial image of the X shaped Staten Island Seaside Hospital in 1924

The Staten Island land acquired along the shore of New Dorp Beach was used for what became St. John's Guild Seaside Hospital. Seaside Hospital was first established as a nursery at New Dorp Beach in 1881, it was also known as the Children's Hospital New Dorp. Although the hospital was not dedicated until June 1899, after significant expansions. The prior year, in September, they reported handling 255 newborns. Until the 1920s, children were brought there by the Floating Hospital of St. John's Guild, which made it one of its stops and lay anchor about half a mile offshore. During World War II, the hospital became Staten Island Area Station Hospital, an annex to Halloran Hospital in Willowbrook, and barracks-like buildings were added on. It closed in 1951 with 48 remaining patients being transferred to Seaview Hospital, also on Staten Island. It was converted into a privately owned nursing home in 1952 called the Seaside Nursing Home. The land was subsequently seized by the city via eminent domain and demolished in 1964 to make way for a never-built parkway called Shore Front Drive proposed by Robert Moses. Remains can still be found in the sand along New Dorp and Cedar Grove Beach.
