= Staten Island University Hospital =

Coordinates: 40.584528°N 74.086046°W

- Northwell Health

Geography
- Location: 475 Seaview Ave, Staten Island, New York, United States

Organization
- Type: Major Teaching
- Affiliated university: State University of New York Downstate Medical Center College of Medicine, Touro College of Osteopathic Medicine, Wagner College
- Network: Northwell Health

Services
- Emergency department: Level I Adult Trauma Center / Level II Pediatric Trauma Center
- Beds: 668

Helipads
- Helipad: NY52

History
- Opened: 1861

Links
- Website: siuh.northwell.edu
- Lists: Hospitals in New York State
- Other links: Hospitals in Staten Island

Staten Island University Hospital (SIUH) is a member hospital of Northwell Health. It is a major tertiary referral center in Staten Island, New York City.

SIUH is a two-campus, 668-bed specialized teaching hospital. Occupying two large campuses, plus a number of community-based health centers and labs, the hospital system provides care to the people of Staten Island and the New York metropolitan area.

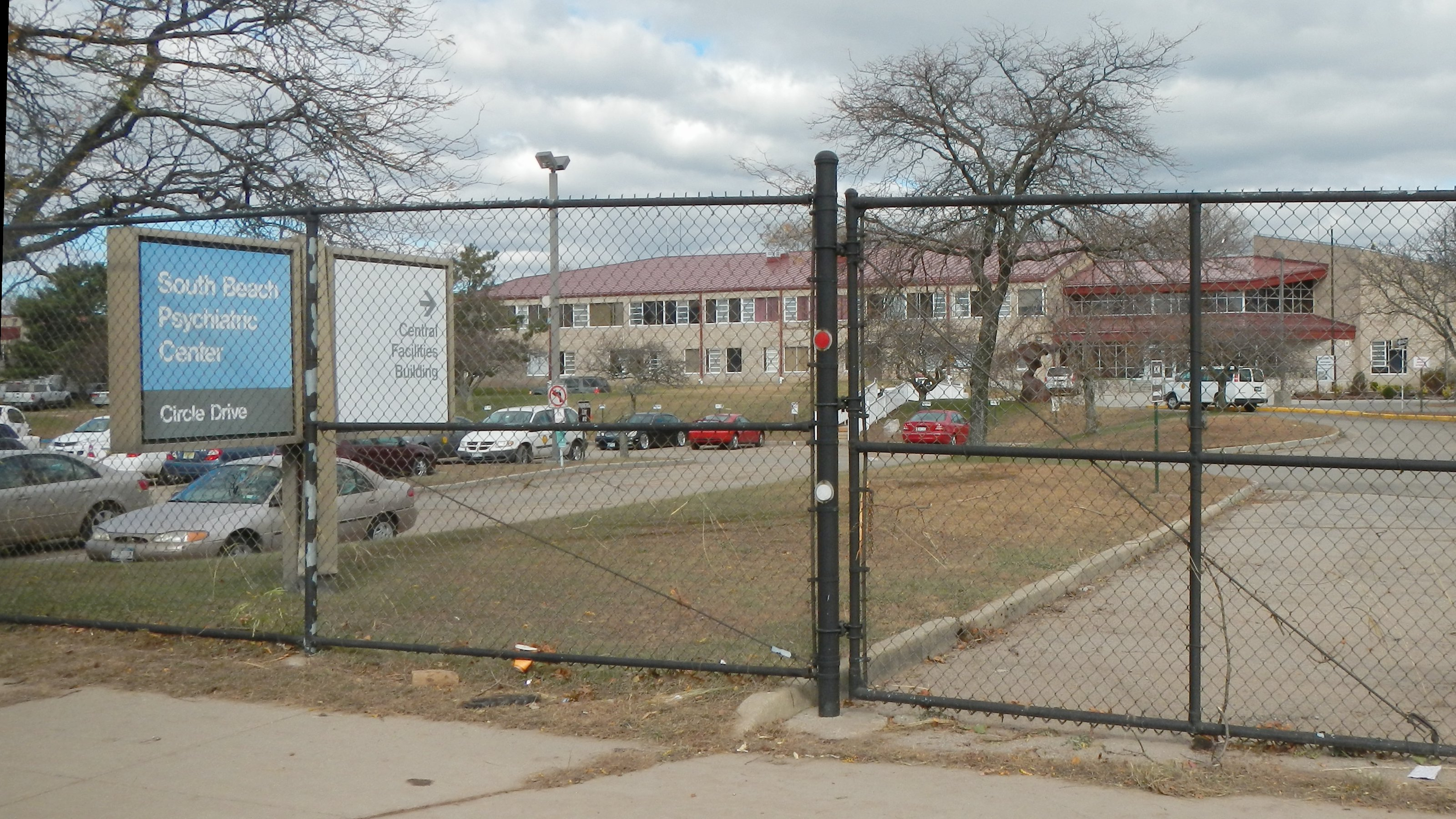
South Beach Psychiatric Center, although not owned by Northwell Health, it sits adjacent to the North Campus.

== History ==
Founded in December 1861 as the Samuel R. Smith Infirmary, the institution adopted its current name during the 1990s with the merger of Staten Island Hospital (now the North Campus) and the Richmond Memorial Hospital (now the South Campus). SIUH maintains an academic affiliation with the State University of New York Downstate Medical Center College of Medicine and Touro College of Osteopathic Medicine, whose medical students and residents complete a portion of their training at SIUH. SIUH also operates, in conjunction with Wagner College, a Physician Assistant training program and a Physician Assistant Fellowship in Emergency Medicine.

SIUH is one of three hospitals in Staten Island and the only one that has an Emergency Medicine Residency.

Dr. Gilbert Lederman became the director of SIUH's radiation oncology department, at age 34. During his tenure, he greatly expanded the department's capacity and installed state-of-the-art equipment, and, "In 1991, Lederman became the first doctor in New York to offer brain radiosurgery." He also aggressively promoted the new treatment, through media advertisements, interviews, presentations at the hospital, attended by "groups of grateful formal patients" (later dubbed "Lederman clubs" and likened to medicine shows, by trial attorney Jonathan Behrins), and an international tour, comprising Lederman's travels to "Italy, England, Israel, and many other countries to speak to prospective patients and examine their CT scans on the spot." The hospital ultimately "started an International Patient Program and opened an office in Naples, Italy. Soon, sick people from all over the world were flying in. Even an ailing Beatle (George Harrison) was willing to give the magic ray gun a shot. Lederman was summoned to the Harrisons’ Swiss villa to make his case for treatment." In November 2001, Harrison began radiotherapy at Staten Island University Hospital, in New York City, for non-small cell lung cancer that had spread to his brain. When the news was publicized, Harrison bemoaned his physician's breach of privacy, and his estate later claimed damages. Harrison's estate later complained that during a round of experimental radiotherapy at Staten Island University Hospital, Lederman repeatedly revealed Harrison's confidential medical information during television interviews and forced him to autograph a guitar. (Note: The suit was ultimately settled out of court under the condition that the guitar be "disposed of".)

In April 2026, the hospital received accreditation as a Center of Excellence in Colorectal Care from the Surgical Review Corporation.

== North Campus ==
The North Campus was constructed in the 1970s when Staten Island Hospital outgrew its original site on Castleton Avenue. It is located at 475 Seaview Avenue, between Mason Avenue and Olympia Boulevard in the South Beach/Ocean Breeze neighborhoods of Staten Island. It houses the Staten Island Heart Institute, Level 1 Trauma Center and the regional Burn center, and serves as a training site for the Hofstra Northwell School of Medicine's graduate medical education (residency) programs in Cardiology, Critical Care Medicine, Dentistry, Emergency Medicine, Gastroenterology, General Surgery, Geriatrics, Hematology, Internal Medicine, Nephrology, Obstetrics/Gynecology, Oncology, Pathology, Pediatrics, Podiatry, Psychiatry, Pulmonology, Radiology, and Vascular surgery.

== South Campus ==
The South Campus was originally the Richmond Memorial Hospital in Prince's Bay, Staten Island. It gained the name Staten Island Hospital South when it merged with the Staten Island Hospital during the 1980s. It is located on the South Shore of Staten Island, on Seguine Avenue. In August, 2021 Northwell announced that they would be renaming the south campus to SIUH Prince's Bay a nod to the community in which the site operates.

== Gallery ==
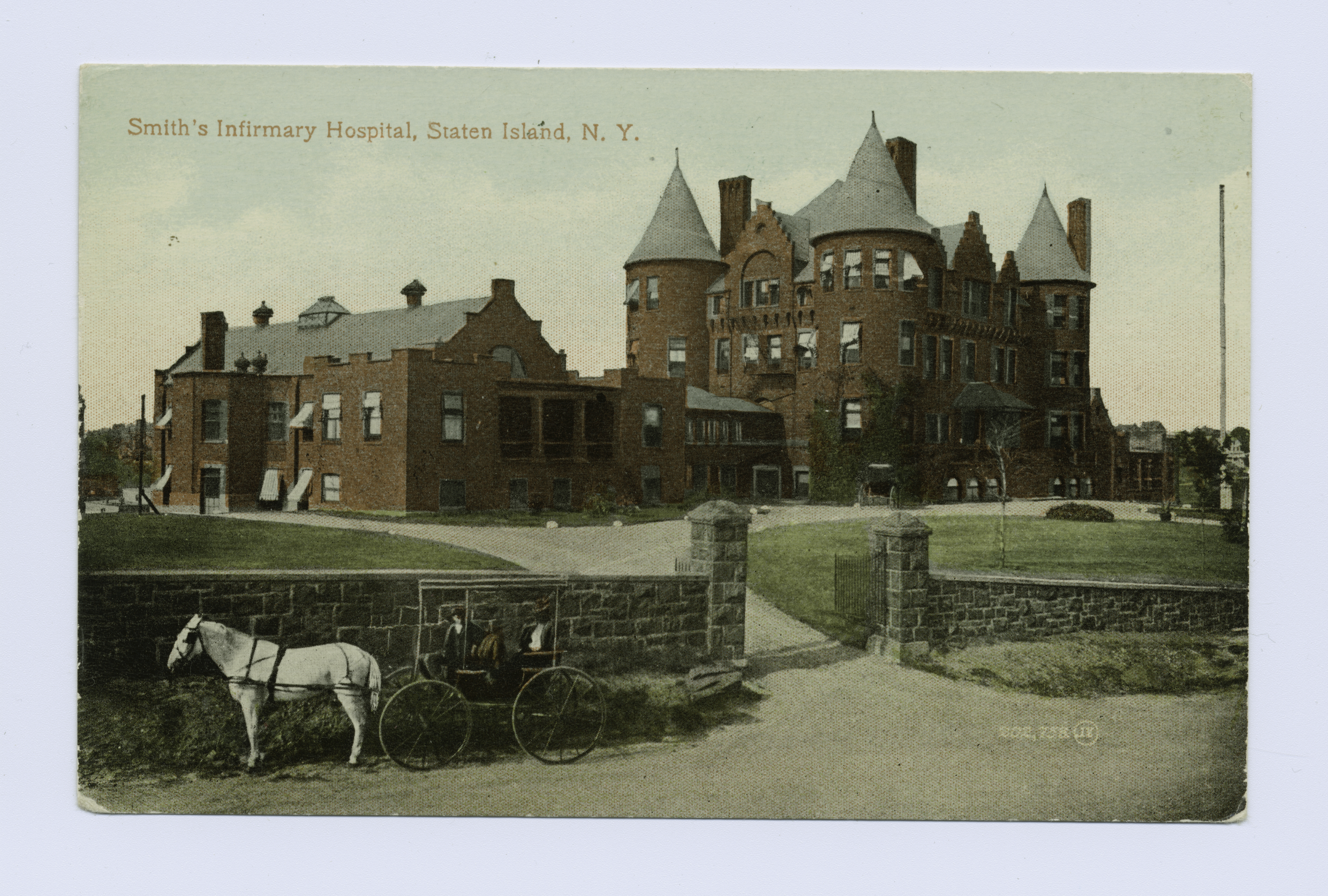
Smith's Infirmary Hospital

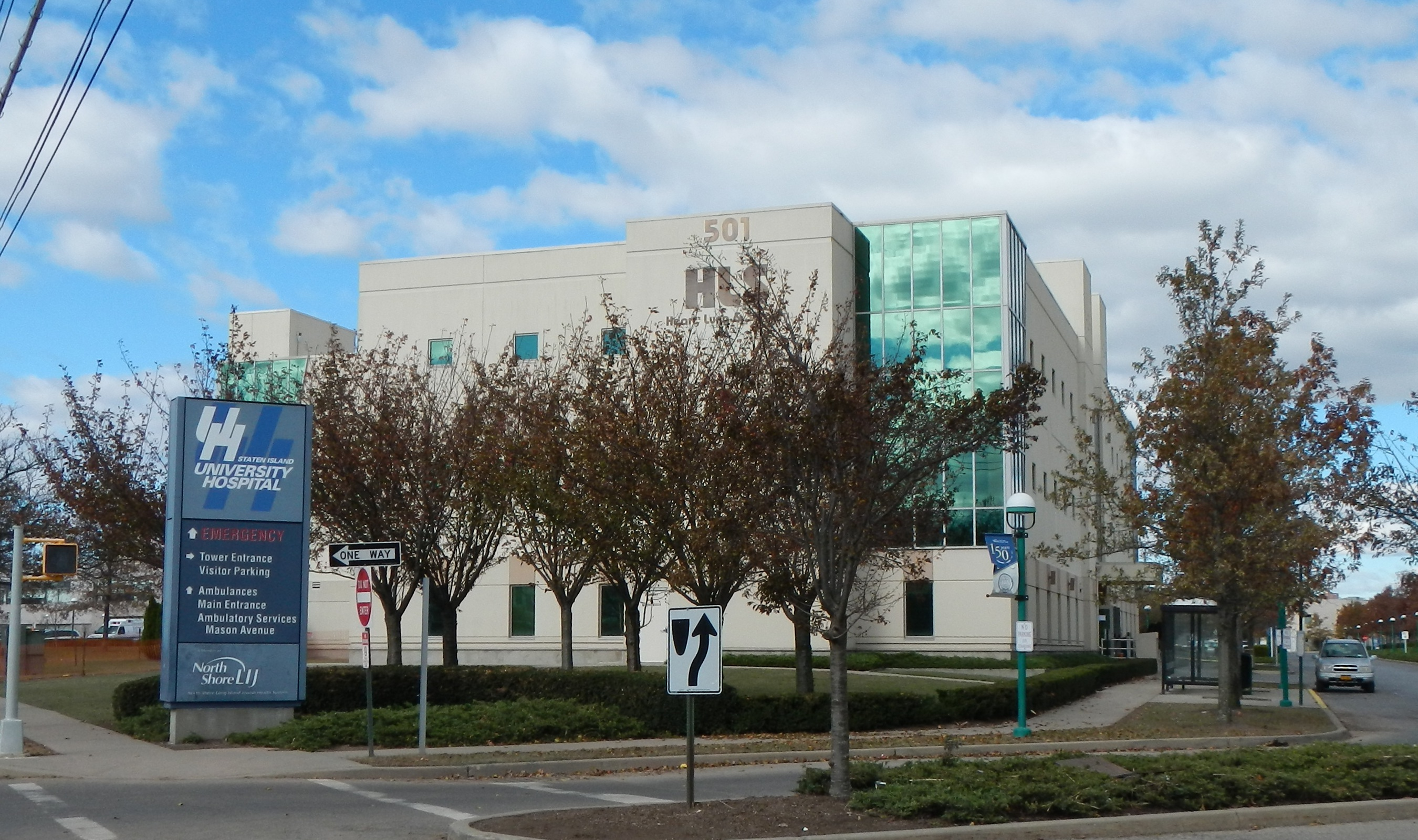
Heart Lung Surgery Building

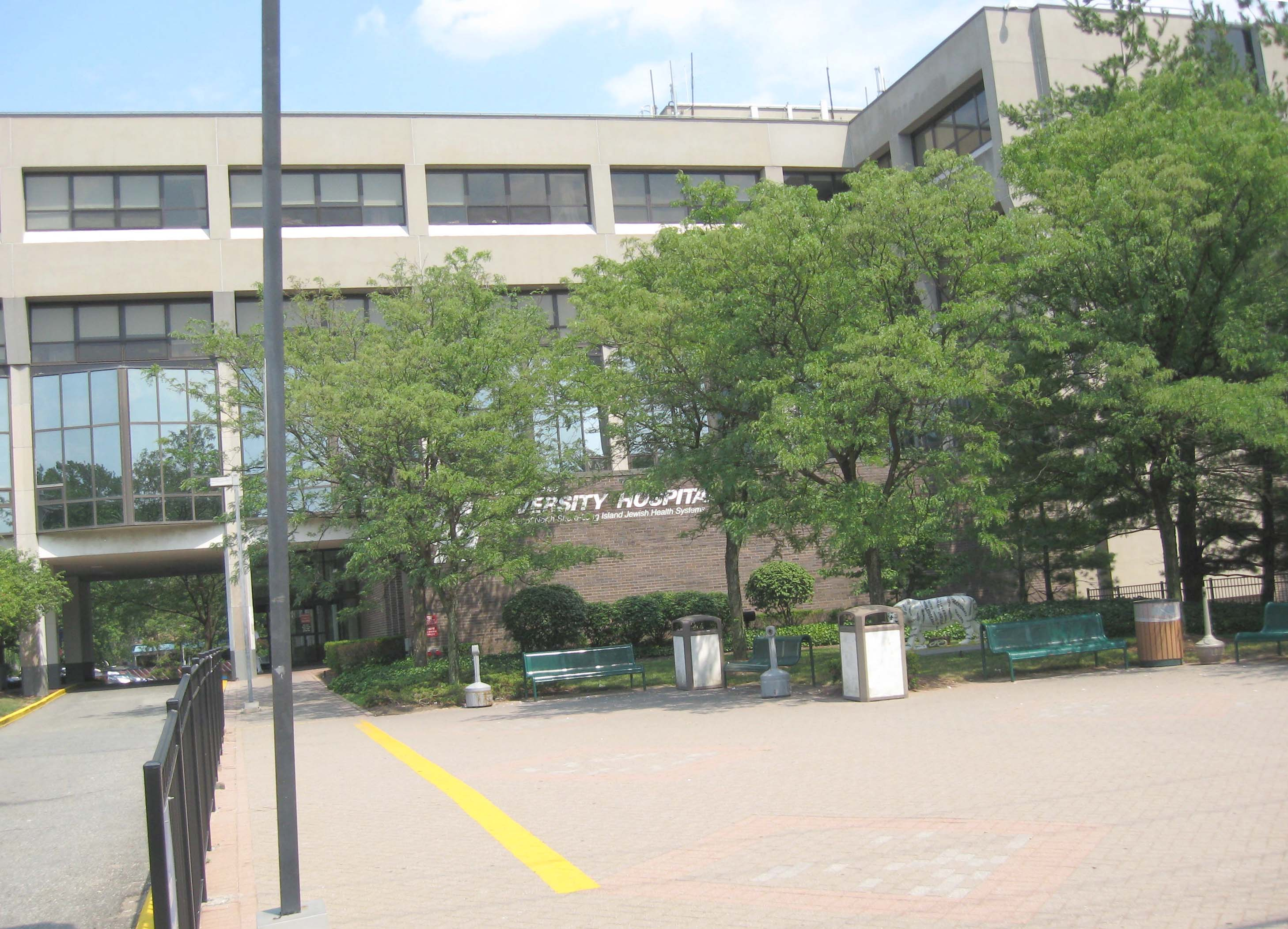
West entrance of the South Campus
