= George Forrester Williams =

American soldier and journalist

George F. Williams
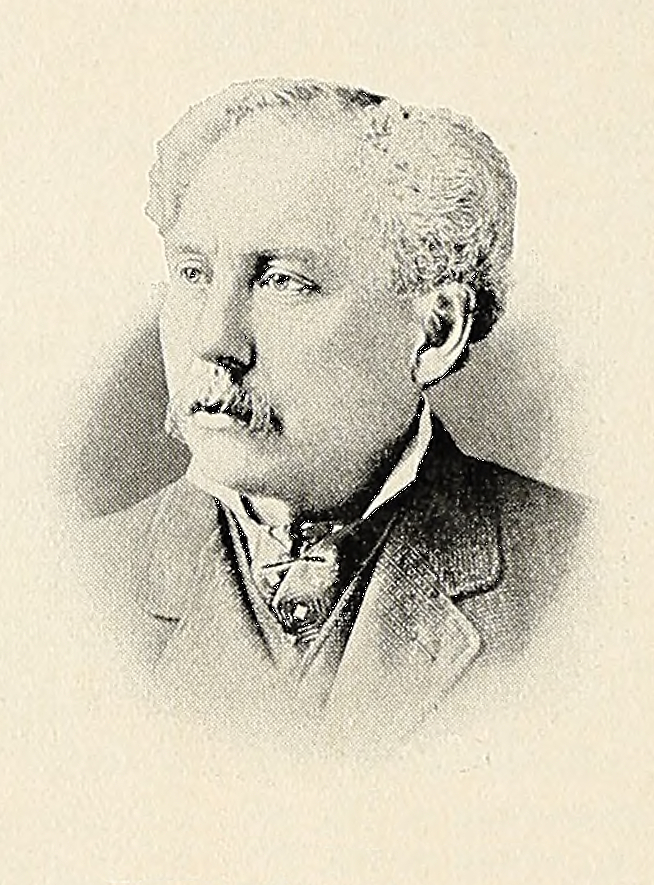
- Born: 1837; Gibraltar
- Died: December 31, 1920 (aged 83); Staten Island, New York
- Occupation: Editor at The New York Times
- Years active: 1870–1873

George Forrester Williams (1837–December 31, 1920) was a soldier, military adviser and journalist who worked as managing editor of the New York Times from 1870 to 1873.

Williams was born in 1837 in Gibraltar to a military family. After living in the East Indies, West Indies and on the African Gold Coast, he arrived in New York City at age 13 following the death of his parents. He found work at the New York Times and stayed there until the start of the American Civil War. He joined the Union Army, rising from private to brevet major and was wounded at the battles of Malvern Hill and the Wilderness.

In the last year of the war, he served as a war correspondent for the Times. After the Confederate surrender, he traveled to Mexico to cover the ending of the Second French intervention in Mexico and attended the execution of Maximilian I of Mexico. He subsequently worked as a military adviser for Guatemala and Peru before returning to New York in 1870, where he was named managing editor of the New York Times.

After leaving the Times, he became managing editor of the New York Herald from 1875 to 1876 and later served in various capacities for other New York newspapers, including the World and Recorder. He published several books:

- Bullet and Shell: A Soldier's Romance (1882), a novelized, fictionalized telling of the Civil War from the perspective of ordinary soldiers.
- Lights and Shadows of Army Life
- Famous War Generals on Horseback
- The Memorial War Book (1894), a pictorial history of the Civil War
