= Elizabeth Seton College =

Former junior college in Yonkers, New York

Coordinates: 40.9728°N 73.8844°W

- Type: Private
- Active: 1961–1989 (merged with Iona College)
- Religious affiliation: Catholic (Sisters of Charity of New York)
- Academic affiliations: Middle States Association of Colleges and Schools
- Budget: $6.5 million (1989)
- President: Mary Ellen Brosnan (1989)
- Undergraduates: 980 (1988), 400 day students; 580 weekend students
- Location: Yonkers, New York, United States
- Campus: Yonkers: suburban, 21 acres (8.5 ha); Manhattan: urban
- Sporting affiliations: Northeastern Athletic Conference

Elizabeth Seton College (ESC) was a private, Catholic two-year college in Yonkers, New York, United States. Run by the Sisters of Charity of New York, the college opened in 1961 and closed in 1989, merging with the more financially secure Iona College in New Rochelle, New York.

== History ==
=== Early years ===
Elizabeth Seton College was opened in 1961 by the Sisters of Charity of New York in the Alder Manor, former home of copper magnate William Boyce Thompson. The mansion was purchased by Archdiocese of New York in 1951, and served as a girls' high school for ten years before being upgraded to a junior college. The first class graduated on 9 May 1963. By 1966, the school had grown to the point when it employed 55 persons, including 29 Sisters of Charity, two diocesan priests, and 24 lay employees.

In 1973, a group of Sotheby Parke Bernet appraisers were invited to the Seton to examine some paintings in the Alder Manor. Upon entering the mansion they noticed what they recognized as a Medici bowl, one of the earliest works of European porcelain, and made in Florence during the reign of Francesco de Medici. It was soon sold by the college at auction, and fetched a price of $180,000 ($994,500 in 2015 dollars), at the time, the largest price ever paid for European porcelain or any pre-19th century work of art, excluding paintings.

Seton was still a women's college as of 1971, but by at least as early as 1973 it was coeducational, and had opened an experimental female dormitory where males were allowed to come in to intermingle.

Mary Ellen Brosnan, became President of Seton College in 1975. Her tenure was marked by advances in the college's academic offerings, including new career programs in radio and television and medical laboratory training. Also introduced during her presidency was the LINK, or Leap Into Knowledge program, which gave high school students the opportunity to receive college credits. She also began a policy of awarding credit based on life learning, and during her tenure, Seton was one of the first three colleges to offer a weekend classes program.

In 1986, Elizabeth Seton College celebrated its 25th anniversary. Part of the ceremonies included a two-part dinner lecture and tour in the Alder Manor, hosted by Brosnan.

=== Merger with Iona College ===
In early December 1988, it was announced that Elizabeth Seton College would merge with Iona College in time for the next fall semester. The merger was, in the words of Iona President John G. Driscoll, "not a rescue operation, but a marriage." According to a 1989 article by The New York Times, trustees of both colleges had commissioned separate studies by task forces over the two months. The results and recommendations were brought before the New York Board of Regents on 17 February 1989.

According to Seton President Mary Ellen Brosnan, the path to the merger had begun "several years ago", amidst declining enrollment and growing competition from "the public sector". She said in 1988:

As the only independent two-year institution in the metropolitan area it was becoming harder and harder to mount enrollment campaigns, especially with a smaller pool of potential students out there. We began to think about it, and decided to make plans to insure that the work this college was doing would continue.

Brosnan said what was then needed was to decide which of the nearby four-year colleges Seton should merge with, and that she decided Iona "made the best fit". Both colleges were private and Catholic, and both were coeducational. Many students from Seton finishing their two-year degrees had continued their education at Iona.

Driscoll also noted the benefits that Iona would receive, saying that the college had "by and large we have used up the space we have in New Rochelle." He said:

So what we have now is the opportunity to have two full-sized campuses in Westchester County with complete reciprocity of programs, so that the two-year educational programs now housed in Seton can equally support four-year education and graduate school.

Seton's "handsome and well-groomed" campus, Driscoll noted, contained a dormitory for 200 students and significant academic space. Iona College had 6,000 students at the time, with an overcrowded campus. Driscoll made a point, however, to convey that the merger was not one of just physical necessity. He told The New York Times in 1989:

There's a six-to-one imbalance in this, if you're talking about size. But it is more a blending of two educational programs, and there you have a basis for parity. What you're really blending would be the Iona educational model, which is four years plus graduate school, and the Seton model, which is a two-year associate degree and certificate program. That's a consolidation, not a question of who is the big brother and who is the little sister.

In addition, Brosnan stated that Seton's two successful nursing programs would be continued under the Iona merger. She said "Nursing enrollments [in general] are going down; ours are going up."

According to the presidents of both colleges, the merger was not a financial move. Brosnan made a note in her announcement that Seton was not being "taken over", saying:

We're in sound fiscal shape; we always get a clean opinion from our auditors. We have a budget of $6.5 million, and we have significant assets.

Driscoll agreed, saying that Seton was much more financially healthy than Ladycliff College and Harriman College, both small, Catholic women's colleges that Iona had previously considered merging with.

Elizabeth Seton College officially merged with Iona College for the fall semester of 1989, making the new two two-campus institution the second largest college or university in Westchester County, close behind Pace University, and ahead of Mercy College and the State University of New York at Purchase.

Brosnan insisted during the negotiation process that "if this consolidation goes through, the name of Elizabeth Seton will be preserved in whatever this place is going to be called." Her statement was fulfilled, as Iona named the new satellite campus the Elizabeth Seton Campus.

The merger was arranged in such a way that incoming freshmen were enrolled "as students of Iona College", according to Driscoll's announcement, while "students enrolled in Seton prior to consolidation could opt to receive their associate degrees either from Seton or Iona."

=== Closure of the campus ===
For a while Iona used both campuses, due to space limitations across the county at its New Rochelle campus. However, six years after the merger, in 1995, Iona closed the campus and consolidated operations in New Rochelle. Driscoll cited financial problems, telling The New York Times:

At first the consolidation was a four-star success. Enrollment doubled in 1990. [But due to economic decline], rather than come to us, our student population was choosing less expensive programs at city and state community colleges. Our best projections showed that we couldn't possibly succeed.

However, some faculty members from the Yonkers campus reported what they believe was a somewhat different reason for the closure. Myra Russel, a longtime associate professor of English at Seton College and later Seton Campus, said that, "they stopped advertising the school completely. They immediately dropped the Seton name and any association with the school." Former Dean of Seton College Richard L. Nicholson also raised concerns, stating, "the precipitous nature of the action by Iona raises questions about their motives."

When Iona College merged with Seton, it did not purchase its assets, but assumed them as liabilities, according to Driscoll, and major repairs were needed for several campus buildings as well as the electrical plant. He reported that "due to their own financial problems, Elizabeth Seton had deferred maintenance on many of its buildings." By his estimation, maintenance of the Seton Campus cost Iona over $1 million a year for four years.

Driscoll announced that Iona's board of trustees was hiring an appraiser and broker for the campus, which was to close after the second semester of 1993. Students were allowed to transfer to Iona's main campus in New Rochelle and would receive reduced tuition. The college also provided application fees to students planning to attend a different college.

While the students' futures were cared for in light of the impending closure of the Seton Campus, yet another controversy arose. The Sisters of Charity who founded Elizabeth Seton College still lived on the property, in the top floor of Alder Manor. With the merger of Iona and Seton several years earlier, Iona President John Driscoll promised the Sisters they would be able to reside on campus for the rest of their lives. The Sisters of Charity of New York, the congregation which the sisters were a part of, agreed to relocate the sisters to outside residences. The last sisters moved out of the Alder Manor in 1996, and they were the last people living on the campus.

=== List of presidents ===
- Miriam Imelda Kieley, (1961–1966)
- Mary Elizabeth Kelly, (1966–1971)
- Eileen Farley, (1971–1975)
- Mary Ellen Brosnan, (1975–1989)

== Academics ==
For a student to make Dean's List, they needed 3.30 out of 4.0 on their GPA.

=== Nursing ===
The college's most successful programs were those of nursing. While other programs at the time were shrinking, Seton's were growing in enrollment, mostly because of their location in four local hospitals, according to Brosnan. She spoke of the program to The New York Times in 1989, saying:

Hospitals that are experiencing problems in getting nurses are trying to set up programs to allow staff members – home health aides, secretaries, others – to begin their nursing education, but they want the programs in the hospitals.

== Student demographics ==
Seton College was a mostly white institution from its founding through the 1970s. However, starting around 1980, the college began to attract minority students in large numbers. President Brosnan stated that while Seton did not ''specifically recruit minorities, we went to the schools where there were minorities'' while seeking students. This trend was accelerated by the opening of the branch campus Manhattan, located in a Catholic high school, which held Friday night and weekend classes for adult students. By 1989, the year the college closed, 59% of students were minorities, and 80% of students in the weekend program were minorities.

In 1989, Seton had 980 students, 580 of whom were weekend students, split between the Manhattan and Yonkers campuses. The other 400 were day students at the Yonkers campus, 150 of whom lived on campus. Another 65 students from Mercy College resided on campus due to the college's lack of residence facilities.

Demographics of Elizabeth Seton College, 1989
	College Overall	Weekend Program	NY (1990)	US (1990)
White	41%	20%	74%	80%
Minority	59%	80%	26%	20%

== Accreditation ==
Elizabeth Seton College was accredited by the Middle States Association of Colleges and Schools on 2 December 1965.

== Campuses ==
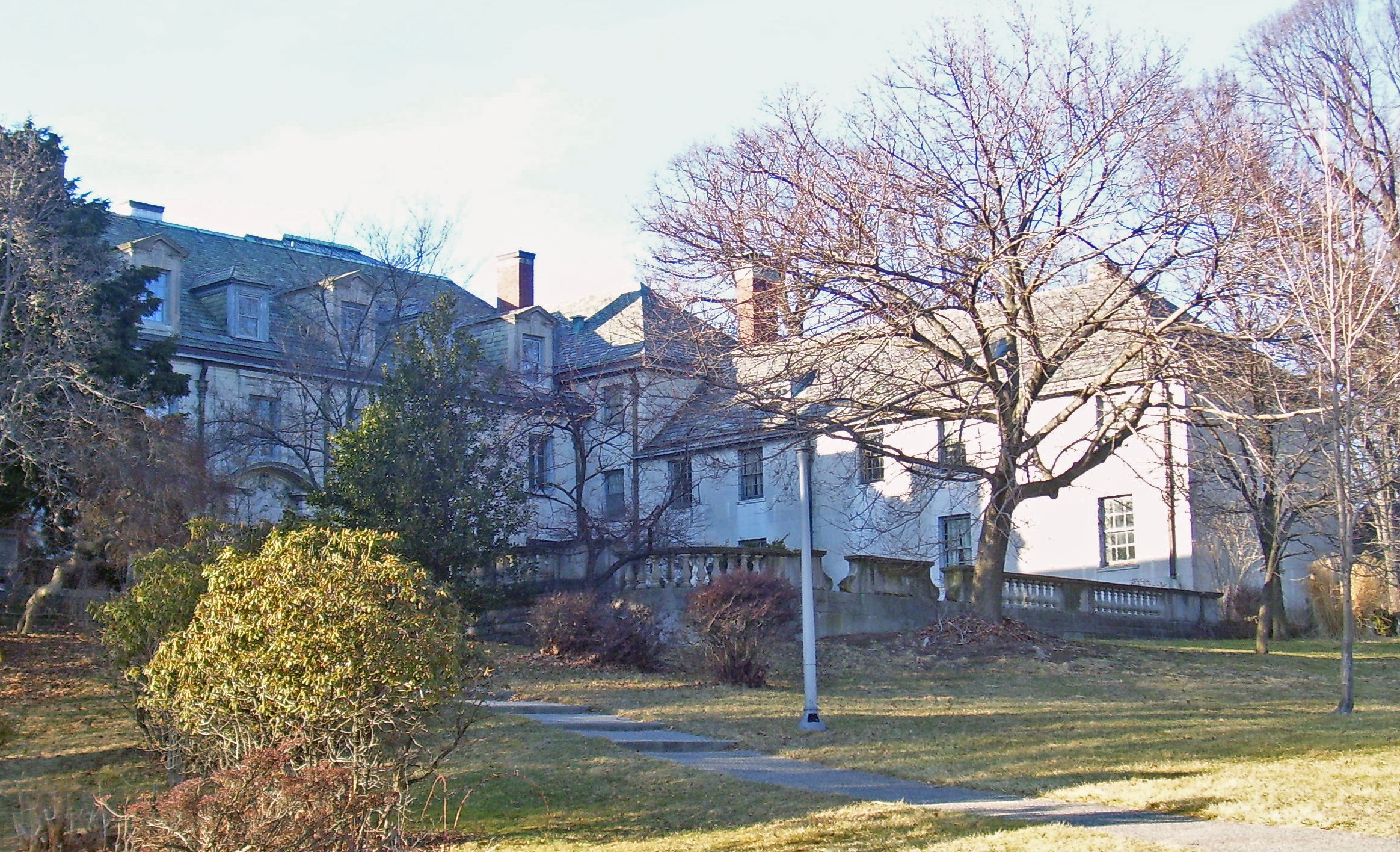
Alder Manor, the main building of the college.

=== Yonkers ===
The main building and focal point of Elizabeth Seton College's 21-acre campus was Alder Manor, alternatively known as the W. B. Thompson Mansion. It housed administration offices, and many of the ornate and art-filled first floor parlors were used as conference rooms. The upper floors were used for classrooms but mostly as housing for the Sisters of Charity. Several academic buildings, an auditorium, and a residence hall with capacity for 200 students existed near the manor on campus grounds, many of them built in the 1960s and 1970s. In the early 1970s, the women's Lenoir Dormitory was constructed next to the Alder Manor. An experiment for the college, it was the first on campus to allow male and female students to congregate for social purposes.

=== Manhattan ===
In 1980, Seton opened a satellite campus in Manhattan to hold weekend classes for adults. It was not a "campus" in the traditional sense, as it was not owned or used permanently by the college. The 19th-century building was an active Catholic girls' high school, St. Michael Academy, located on West 33rd Street between Ninth and Tenth Avenues. The weekend program turned out to be financially successful, and attracted more minorities to the college enrollment.

== Clubs and organizations ==
- Art Club
- Drama Club
- Elizabethan – student newspaper
- Glee Club
- Sodality
- Student Council
- Yearbook – The Chandelle
- Young Citizens

== Athletics ==
Elizabeth Seton College competed in the now-defunct Northeastern Athletic Conference (not to be confused with the recently created North Eastern Athletic Conference). They competed mostly against other women's colleges in the early years.

=== Varsity athletic programs ===
The following is an incomplete list of men's and women's sports offered at the college.

Women	Men
Basketball	Basketball
Volleyball	

== Notable alumni ==
- Jane Curtin, film and television actor – Class of 1967
- Giancarlo Esposito, film and television actor – Class of 1977

== See also ==
- List of defunct colleges and universities in New York
