= Inn =

Establishment providing lodging, food, and drink

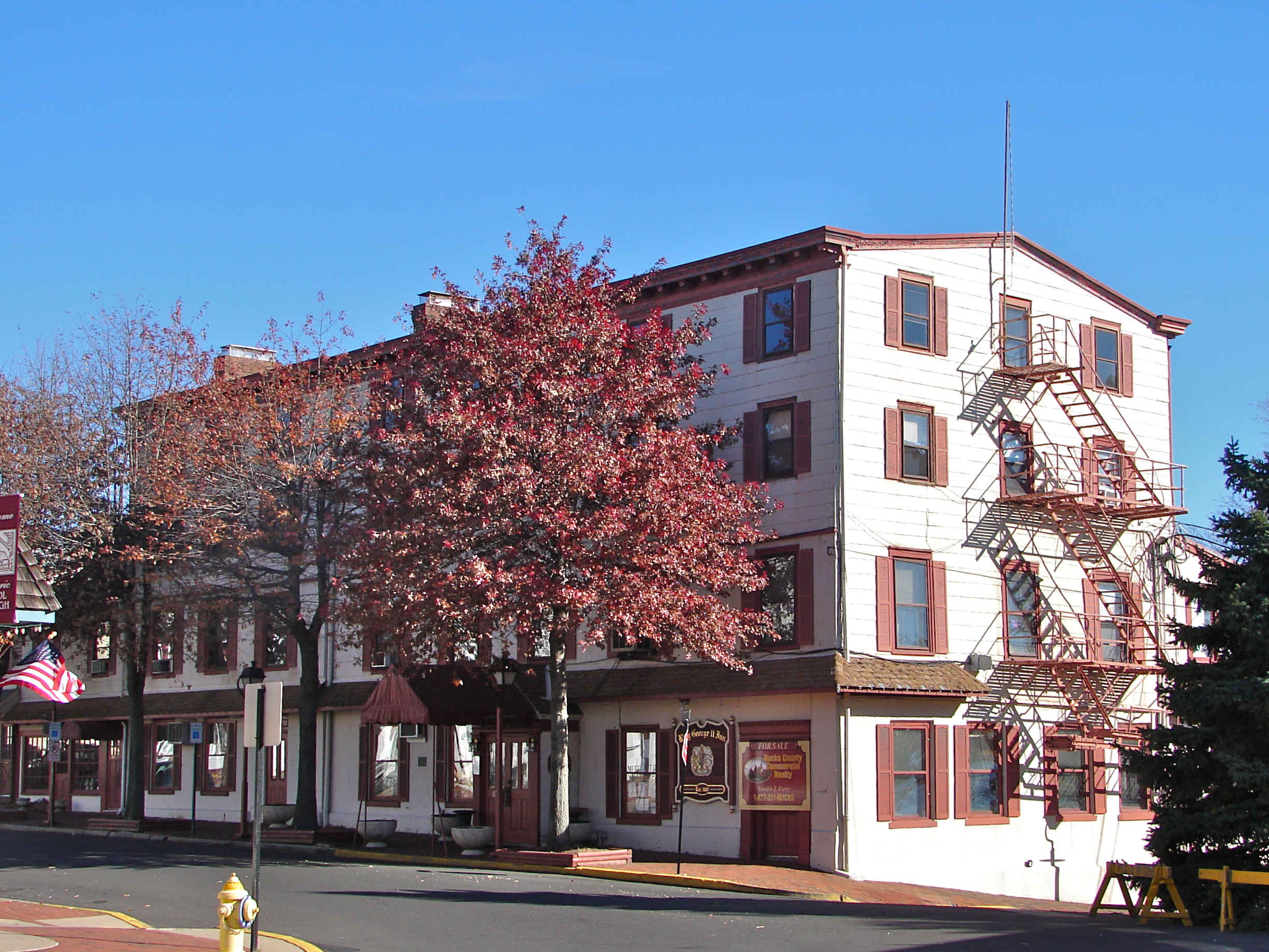
King George II Inn in Bristol, Pennsylvania, founded in 1681, the oldest inn in the United States

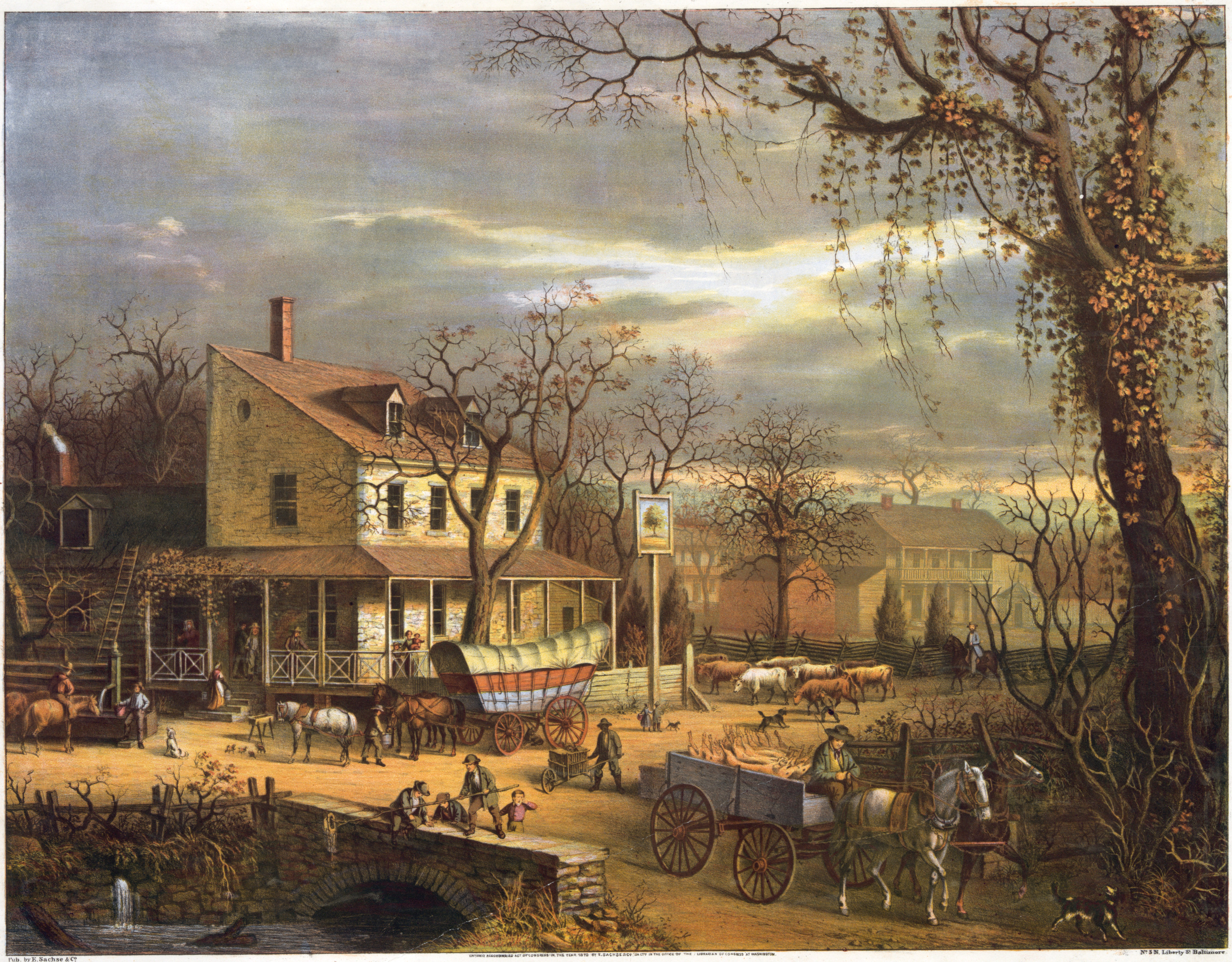
American Scenery—the Inn on the Roadside, an 1872 portrait

Inns are generally establishments or buildings where travelers can seek lodging, and usually, food and drink. Inns are typically located in the country or along a highway. Before the advent of motorized transportation, they also provided accommodation for horses.

An innkeeper is the person who runs an inn.

== History ==
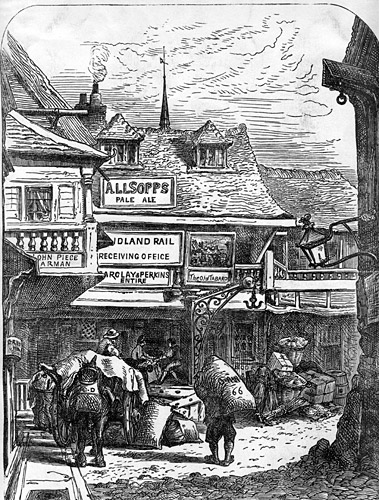
The Tabard Inn in Southwark, London, around 1850

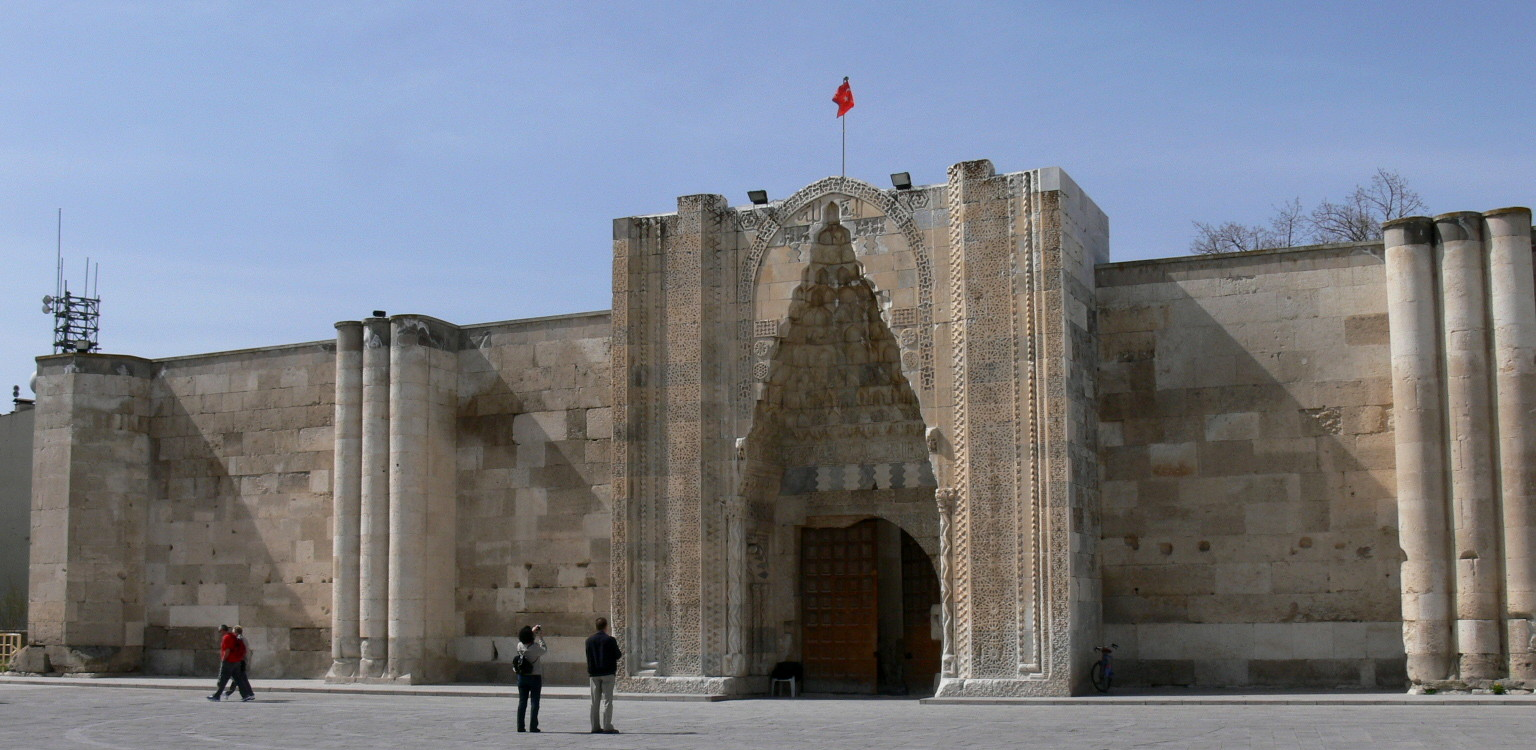
Façade of Sultanhanı caravanserai in Aksaray Province, Turkey

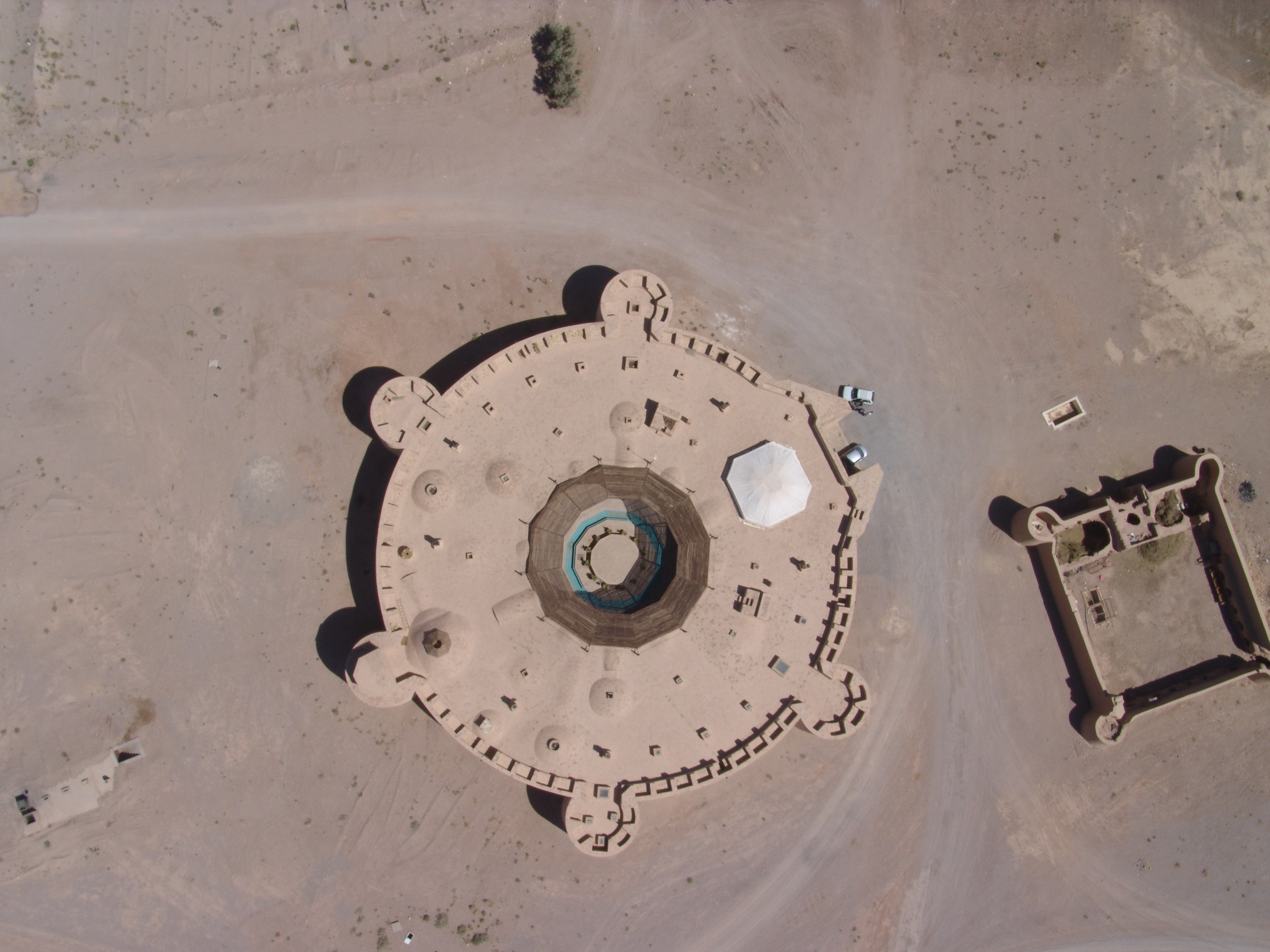
An August 2007 aerial view of Zein-o-din caravanserai near Yazd, Iran, one of a few circular caravanserai

Inns in Europe were possibly first established when the Romans built their system of Roman roads 2,000 years ago. Many inns in Europe are several centuries old. In addition to providing for the needs of travelers, inns traditionally acted as community gathering places.

Historically, inns provided not only food and lodging, but stabling and fodder for the travelers' horses, as well. Famous London examples of inns include The George and The Tabard. However, there is no longer a formal distinction between an inn and several other kinds of establishments: many pubs use the name "inn", either because they are long established and may have been formerly coaching inns, or to summon up a particular kind of image.

Inns were like bed and breakfasts, with a community dining room which was also used for town meetings or rented for wedding parties. The front, facing the road, was ornamental and welcoming for travelers. The back also usually had at least one livery barn for travelers to keep their horses. There were no lobbies as in modern inns; rather, the innkeeper would answer the door for each visitor and judge the people whom he decided to accommodate, it was up to the visitors to convince the innkeeper for accommodation. In some English towns, bye-laws would require innkeepers to offer all visitors a bed. Many inns were simply large houses that had extra rooms for renting. An inn may have had several uses, for example, Goat Inn, Bottle Bank "a pub 'where a person could get drunk, commit an offence, and be arrested, tried and sentenced without leaving the building', because it had other rooms which were used as a police station and a court"

In 14th-century England, the courtyards of the inns were often not paved or cobbled but rather flattened earth or mud. These inns would be made of two-story timber framed buildings with steep shingle roofs. Stable boys were in charge of stabling horses at the rear yard of the inn where they are watered and fed. Usual foods served included pottage, bread and cheese with ale for drinking. In some towns, innkeepers are only allowed to offer food and drinks to guests. The better managed inns would place fresh rushes on the floor, mixed with rose petals, lavender and herbs. Lighting would be dim, as candles were made of tallow. For toilet facilities, inns would simply provide a seat and a barrel which were emptied every morning. Beds would accommodate more than one man, sometimes even a dozen.

During the 19th century, the inn played a major role in the growing transportation system of England. Industry was on the rise, and people were traveling more in order to keep and maintain business. The English inn was considered an important part of English infrastructure, as it helped maintain a smooth flow of travel throughout the country.

As modes of transport have evolved, tourist lodging has adapted to serve each generation of traveler. A stagecoach made frequent stops at roadside coaching inns for water, food, and horses. A passenger train stopped only at designated stations in the city center, around which were built grand railway hotels. Motorcar traffic on old-style two-lane highways might have paused at any camp, cabin court, or motel along the way, while freeway traffic was restricted to access from designated off-ramps to side roads which quickly become crowded with hotel chain operators.

The original functions of an inn are now usually split among separate establishments. For example, hotels, lodges and motels might provide the traditional functions of an inn but focus more on lodging customers than on other services; public houses (pubs) are primarily alcohol-serving establishments; and restaurants and taverns serve food and drink. (Hotels often contain restaurants serving full breakfasts and meals, thus providing all of the functions of traditional inns. Economy, limited service properties, however, lack a kitchen and bar, and therefore claim at most an included continental breakfast.)

The lodging aspect of the word inn lives on in some hotel brand names, like Holiday Inn, and the Inns of Court in London were once accommodations for members of the legal profession. Some laws refer to lodging operators as innkeepers.

== Forms ==
Other forms of inns exist throughout the world. Among them are the honjin and ryokan of Japan, caravanserai of Central Asia and the Middle East, and jiuguan in ancient China.

In Asia Minor, during the periods of rule by the Seljuk and Ottoman Turks, impressive structures functioning as inns (Turkish: han) were built because inns were considered socially significant. These inns provided accommodations for people and either their vehicles or animals, and served as a resting place to those traveling on foot or by other means.

These inns were built between towns if the distance between municipalities was too far for one day's travel. These structures, called caravansarais, were inns with large courtyards and ample supplies of water for drinking and other uses. They typically contained a café, in addition to supplies of food and fodder. After the caravans traveled a while they would take a break at these caravansarais, and often spend the night to rest the human travelers and their animals.

== Usage of the term ==
The term "inn" historically characterized a rural hotel which provided lodging, food and refreshments, and accommodations for travelers' horses. To capitalize on this nostalgic image many typically lower end and middling modern motor hotel operators seek to distance themselves from similar motels by styling themselves "inns", regardless of services and accommodations provided. Examples are Comfort Inn, Days Inn, Holiday Inn, Knights Inn, and Premier Inn.

The term "inn" is also retained in its historic use in many laws governing motels and hotels, often known as "innkeeper's acts", or refer to hôteliers and motel operators as "innkeepers" in the body of the legislation These laws typically define the innkeepers' liability for valuables entrusted to them by clients and determine whether an innkeeper holds any lien against such goods. In some jurisdictions, an offense named as "defrauding an innkeeper" prohibits fraudulently obtaining "food, lodging, or other accommodation at any hotel, inn, boarding house, or eating house"; in this context, the term is often an anachronism as the majority of modern restaurants are free-standing and not attached to coaching inns or tourist lodging.

== Gallery ==
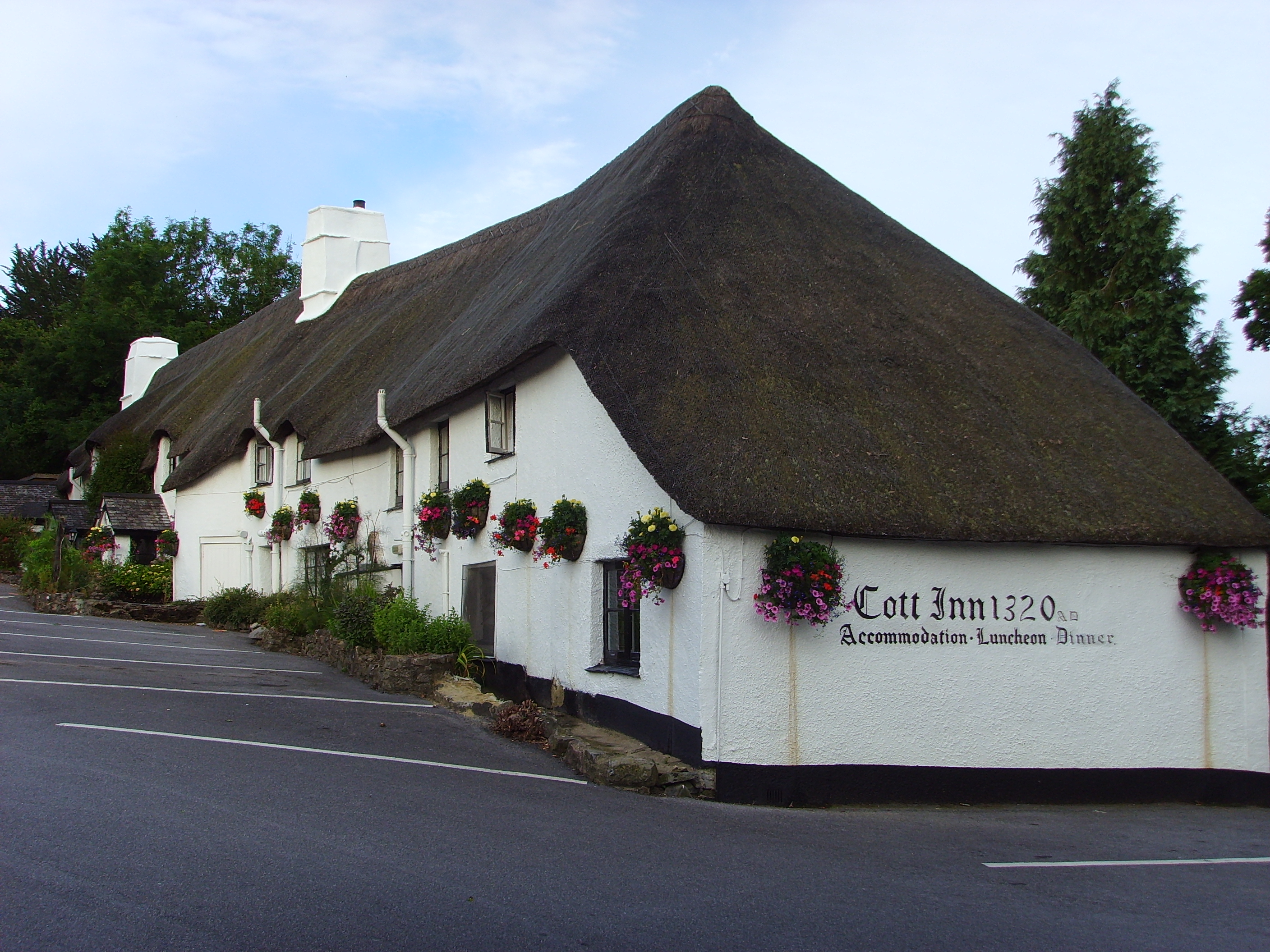
The Cott Inn at Cott, Dartington, Devon, UK dates from 1320

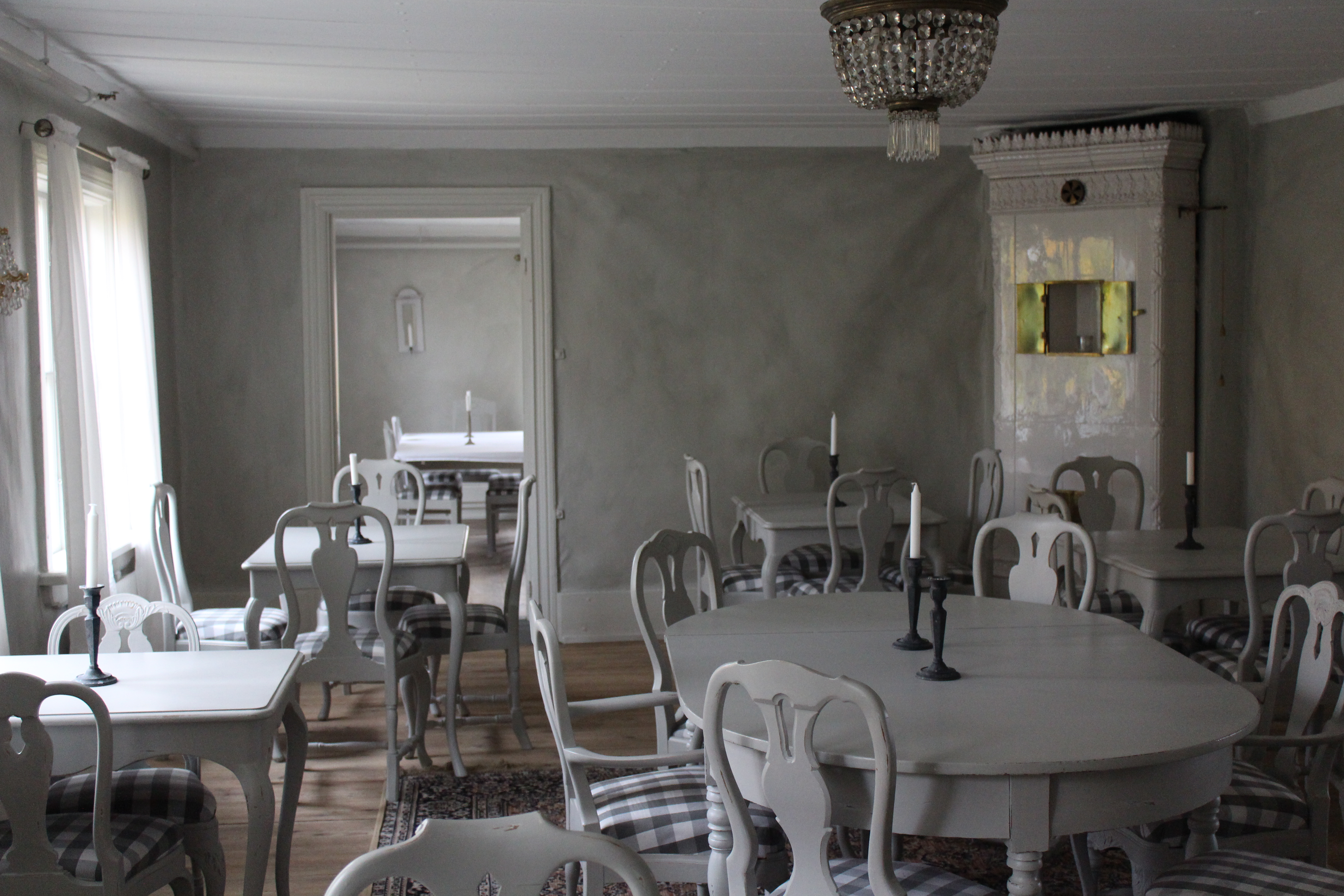
Östervåla Inn, Sweden, interior

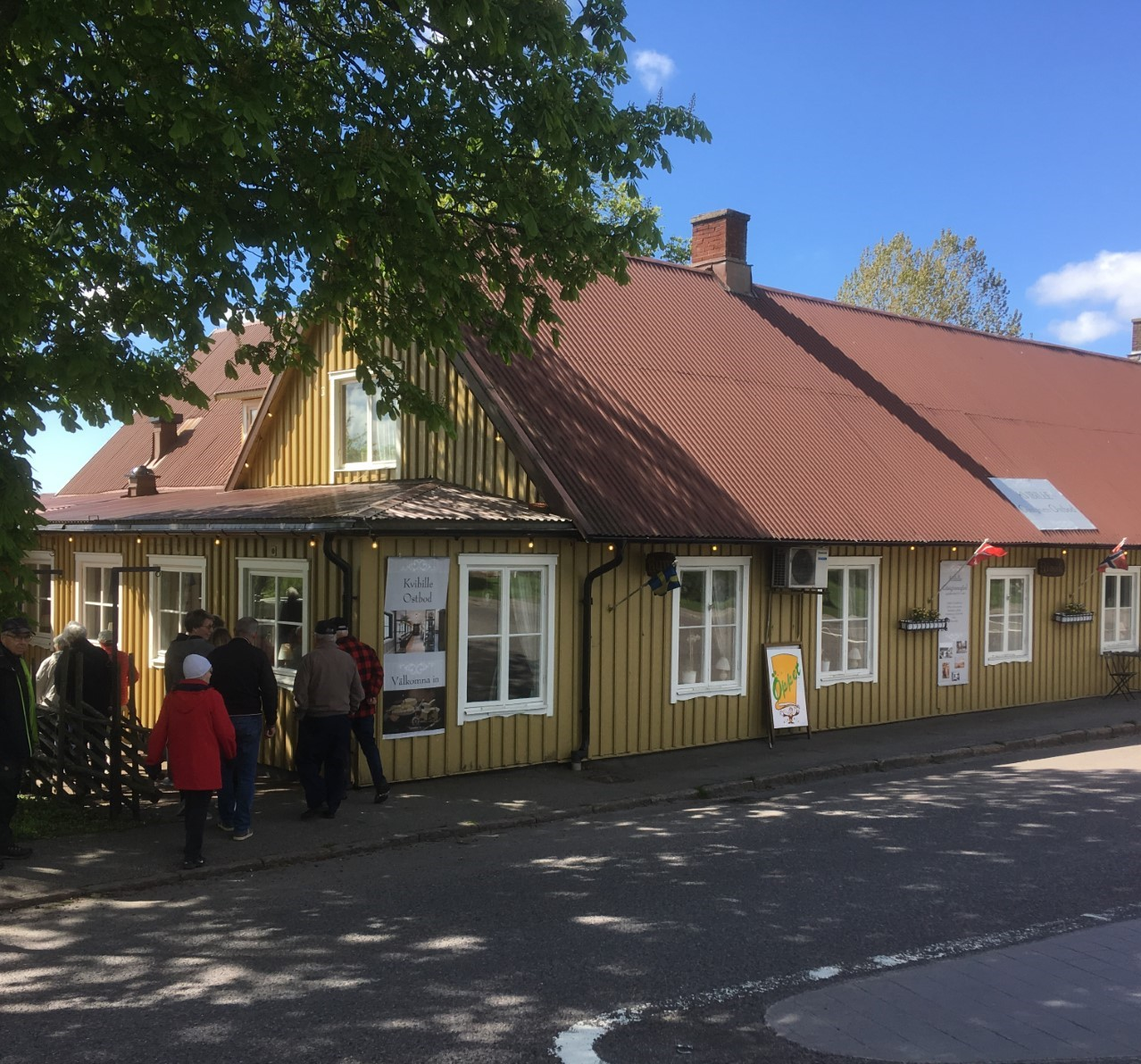
Kvibille Gästgivargård (Inn), Sweden, dating from 1645

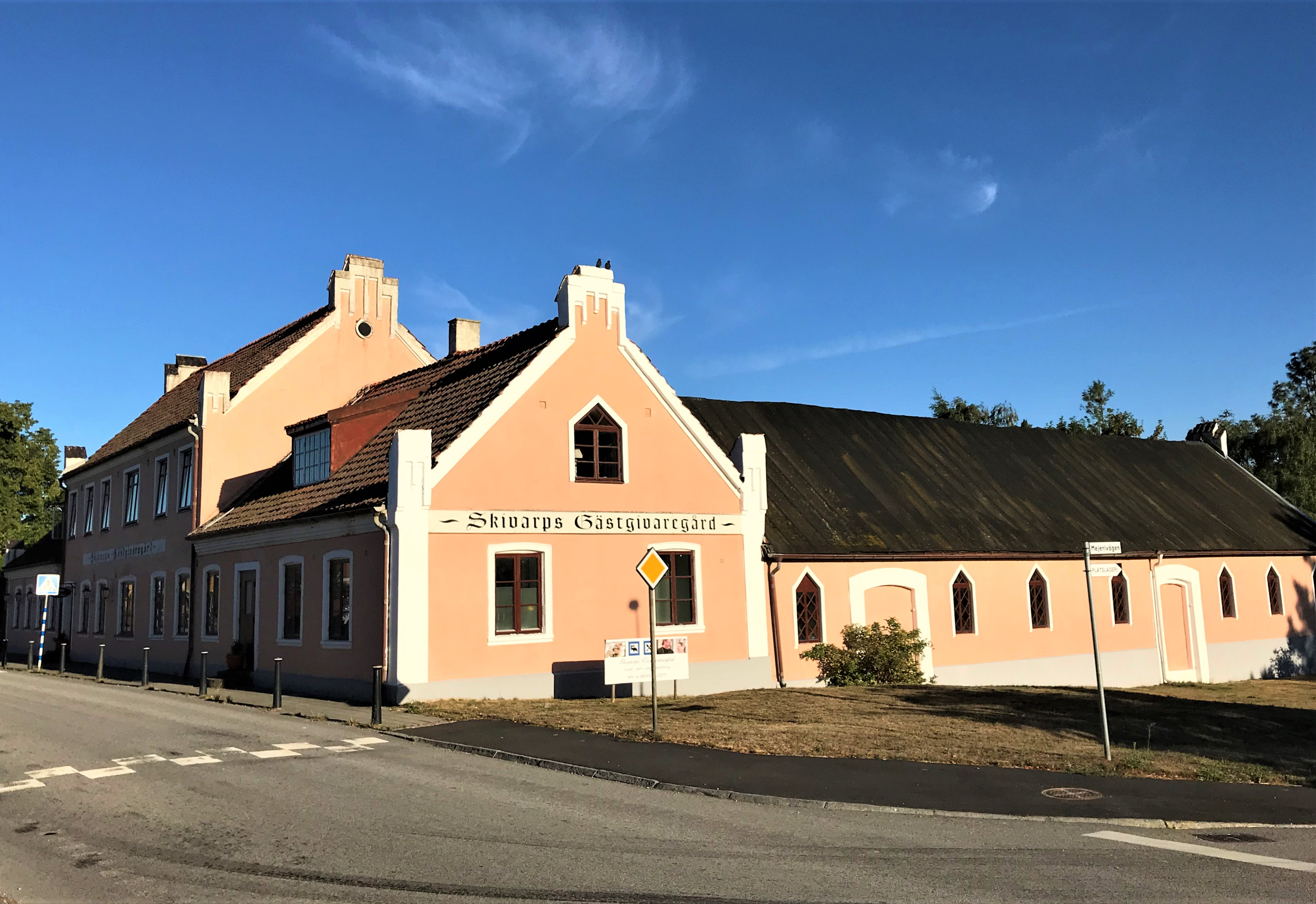
Skivarps Gästgivargård (Inn), Sweden, dating from 1680

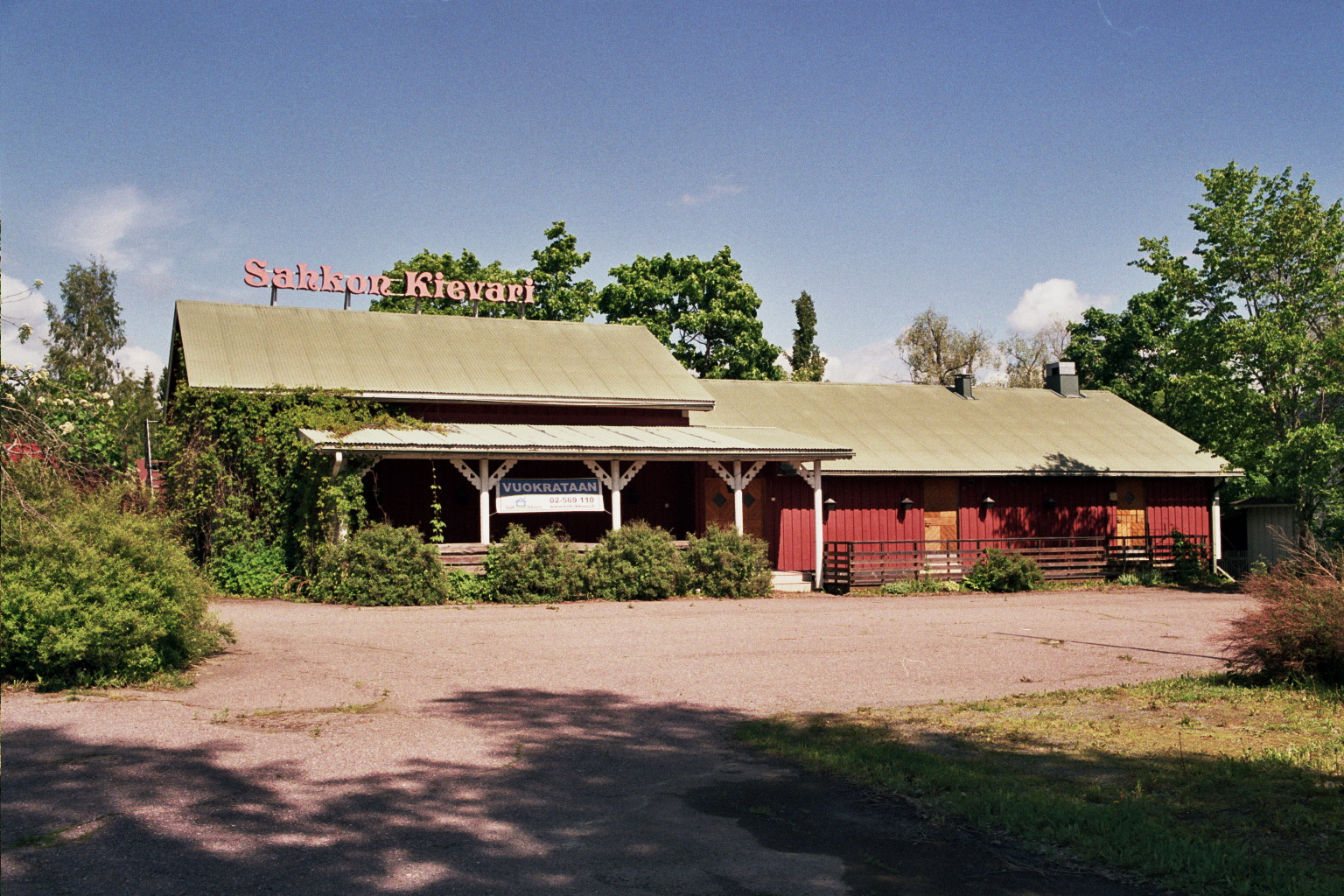
Sahkon Kievari ("Sahko's Inn") in Huittinen, Finland

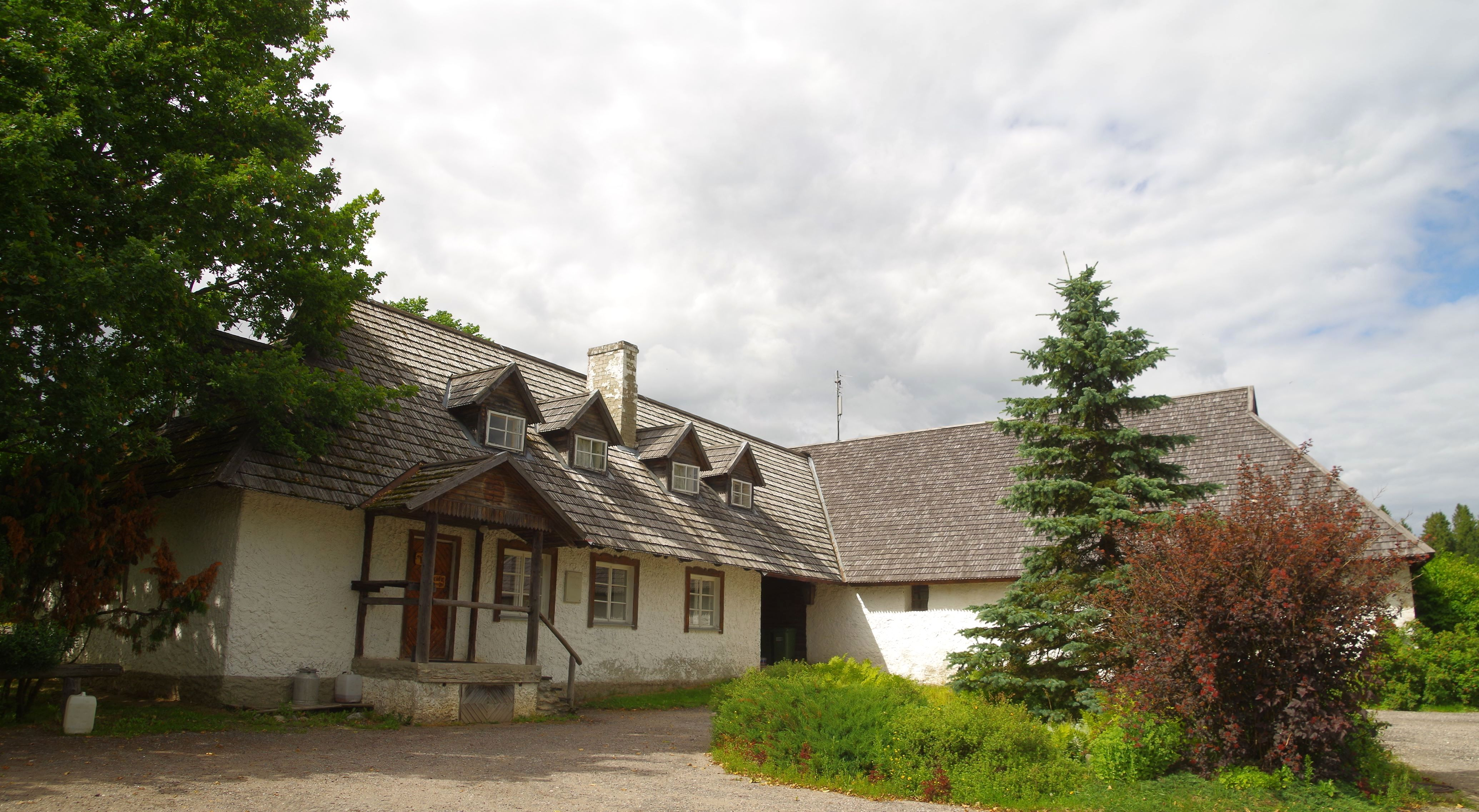
Nõmme Kõrts, an inn in Nõmme, Tallinn, Estonia

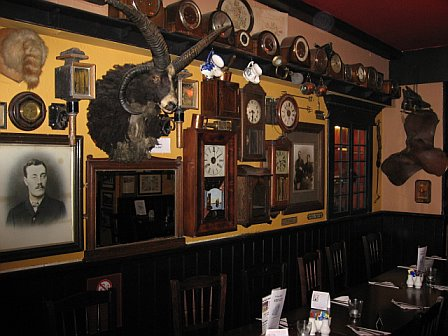
Sheep's Heid Inn, Edinburgh, Scotland, interior

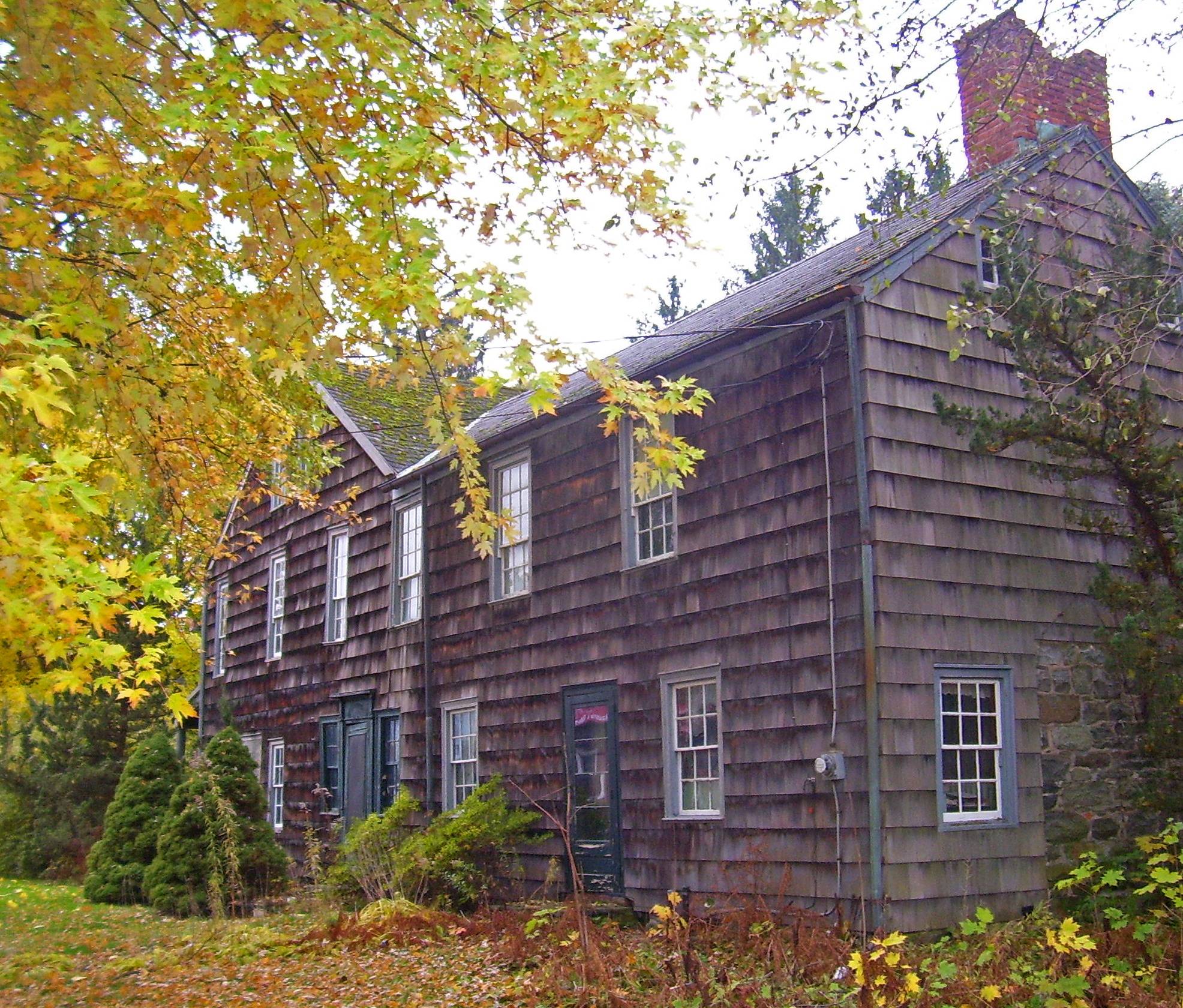
Yelverton Inn, in Chester, New York, U.S.

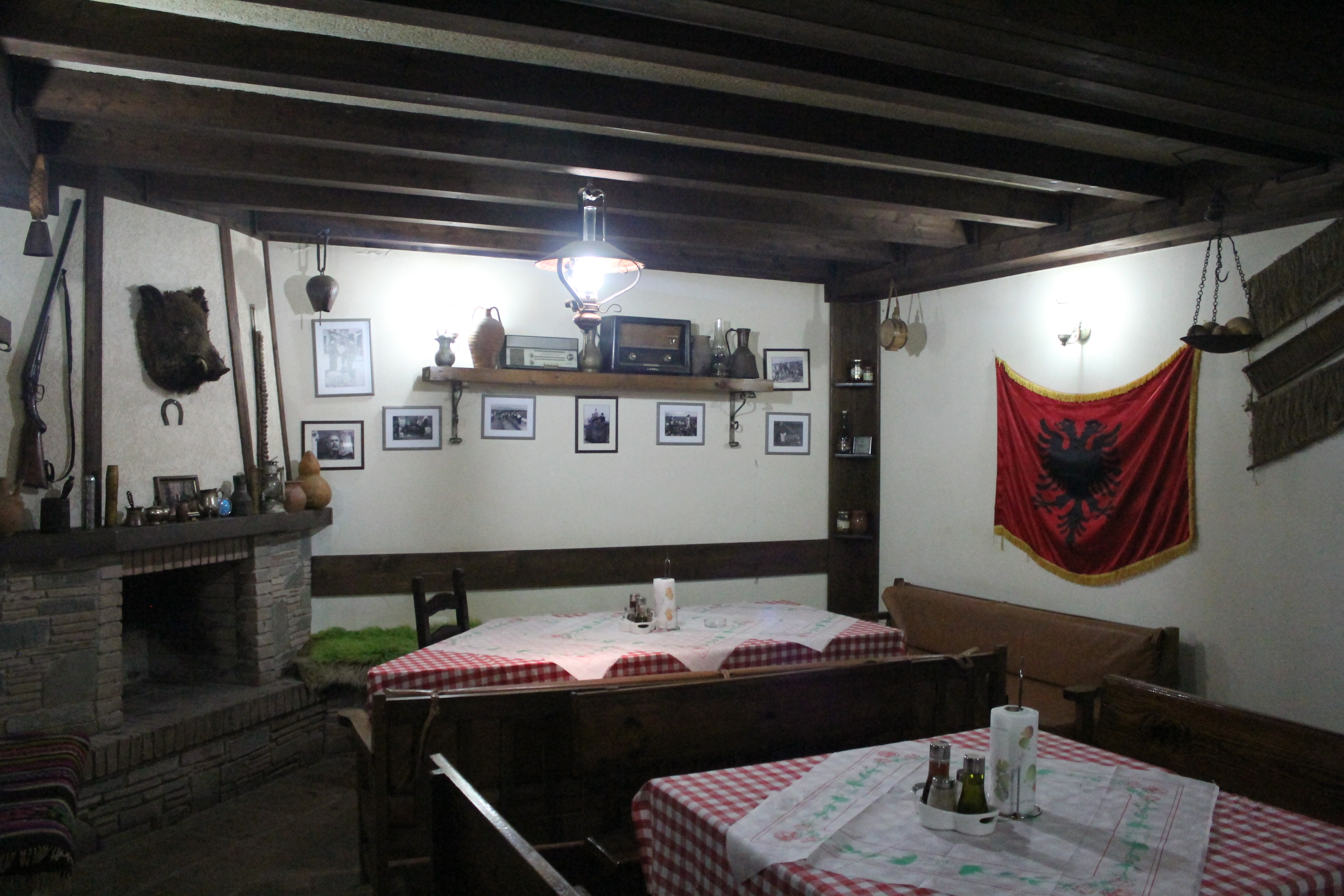
An Albanian inn, interior

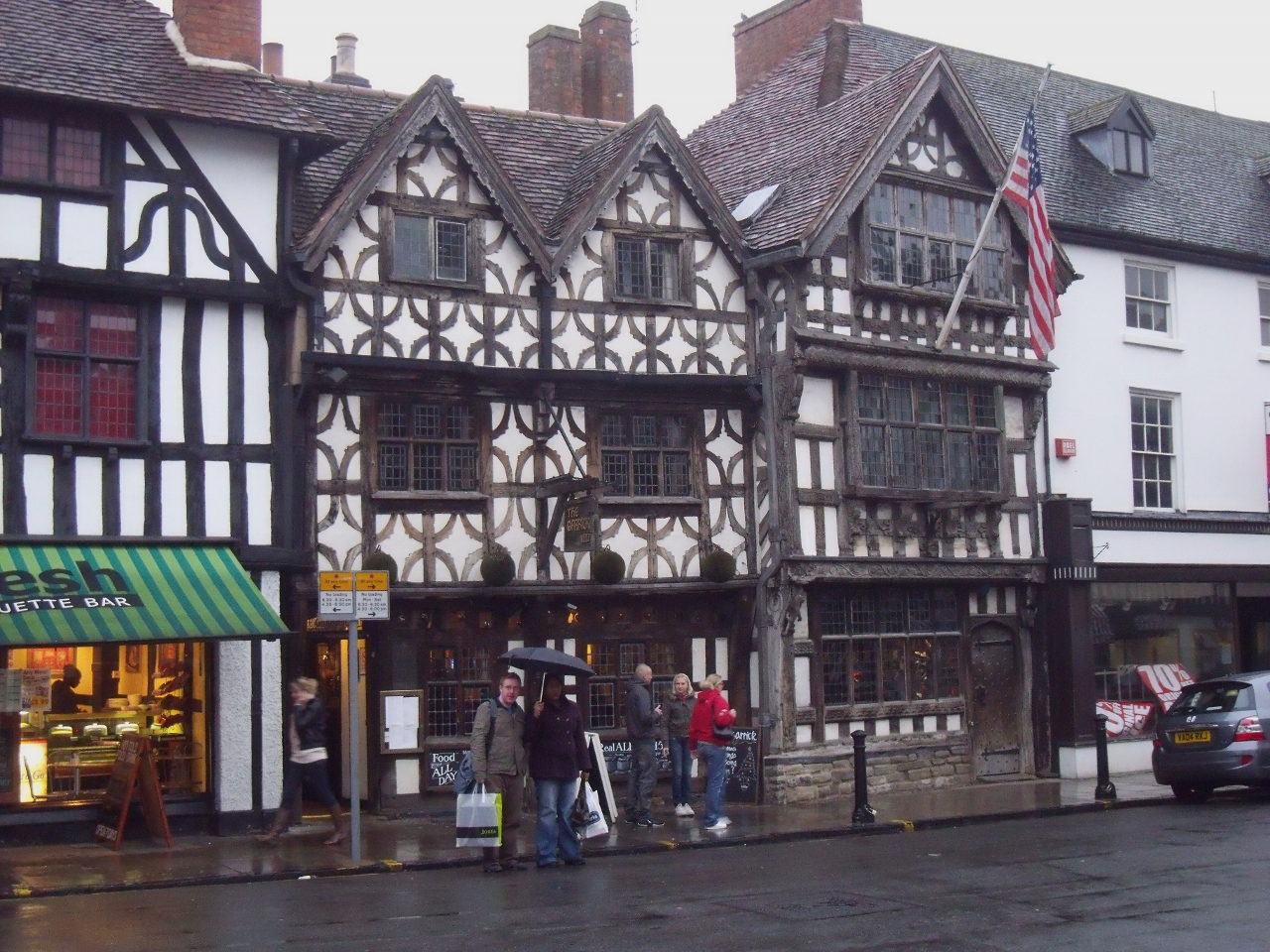
The Garrick Inn, Stratford-upon-Avon, England, is a timber framed building dating back to the 15th century.

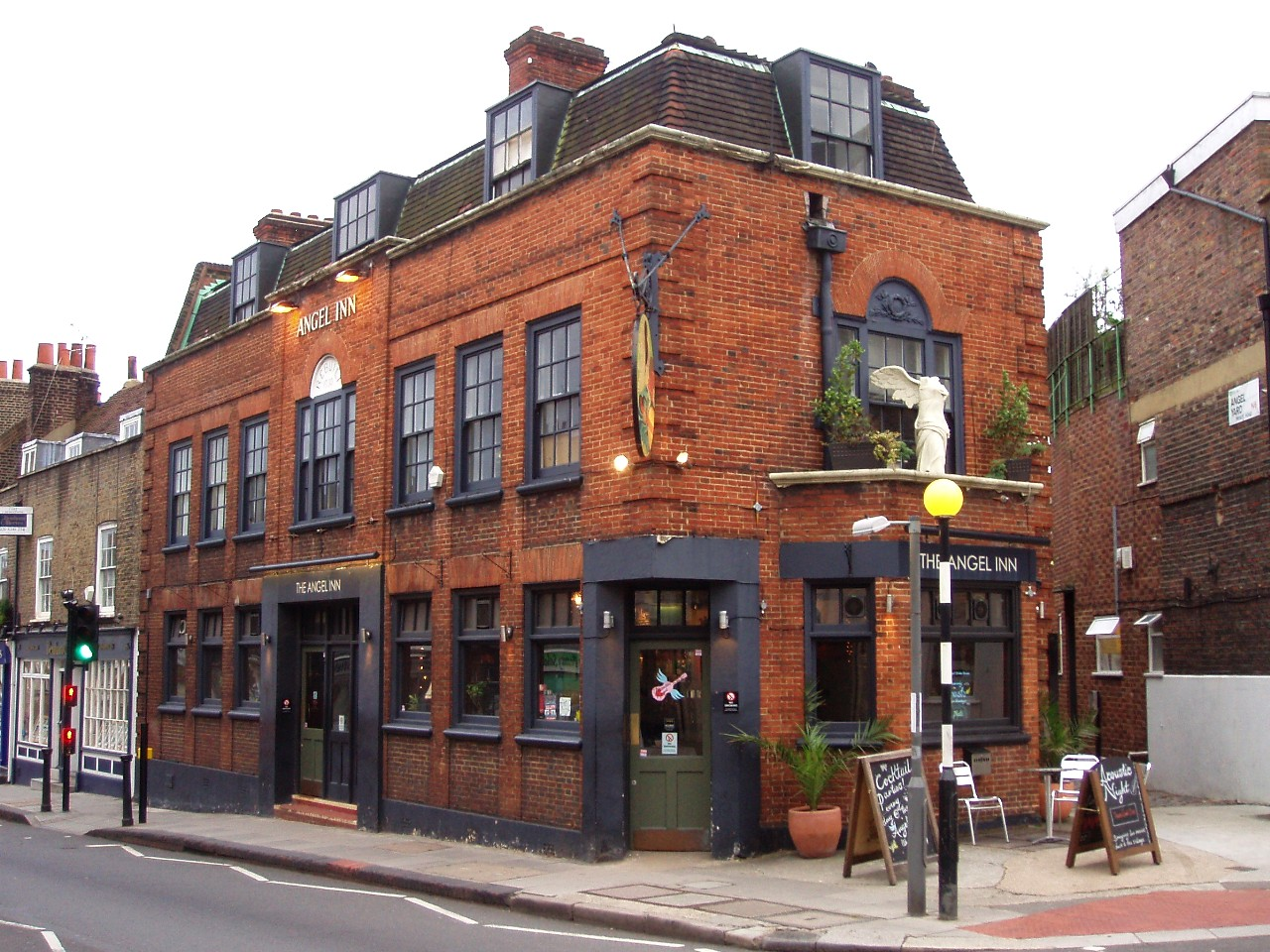
Angel Inn, Highgate, north London, England

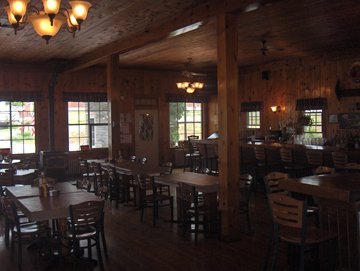
The Thunder Bay Inn in Big Bay, Michigan, U.S.

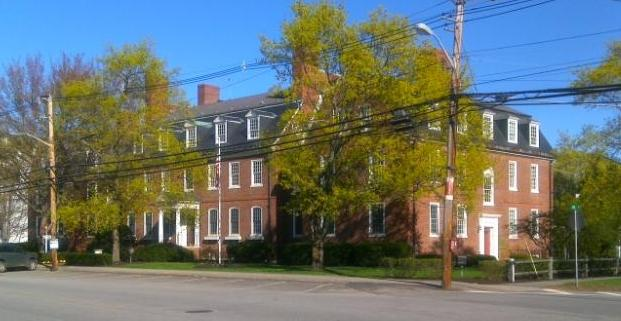
The Exeter Inn, Exeter, New Hampshire, U.S.

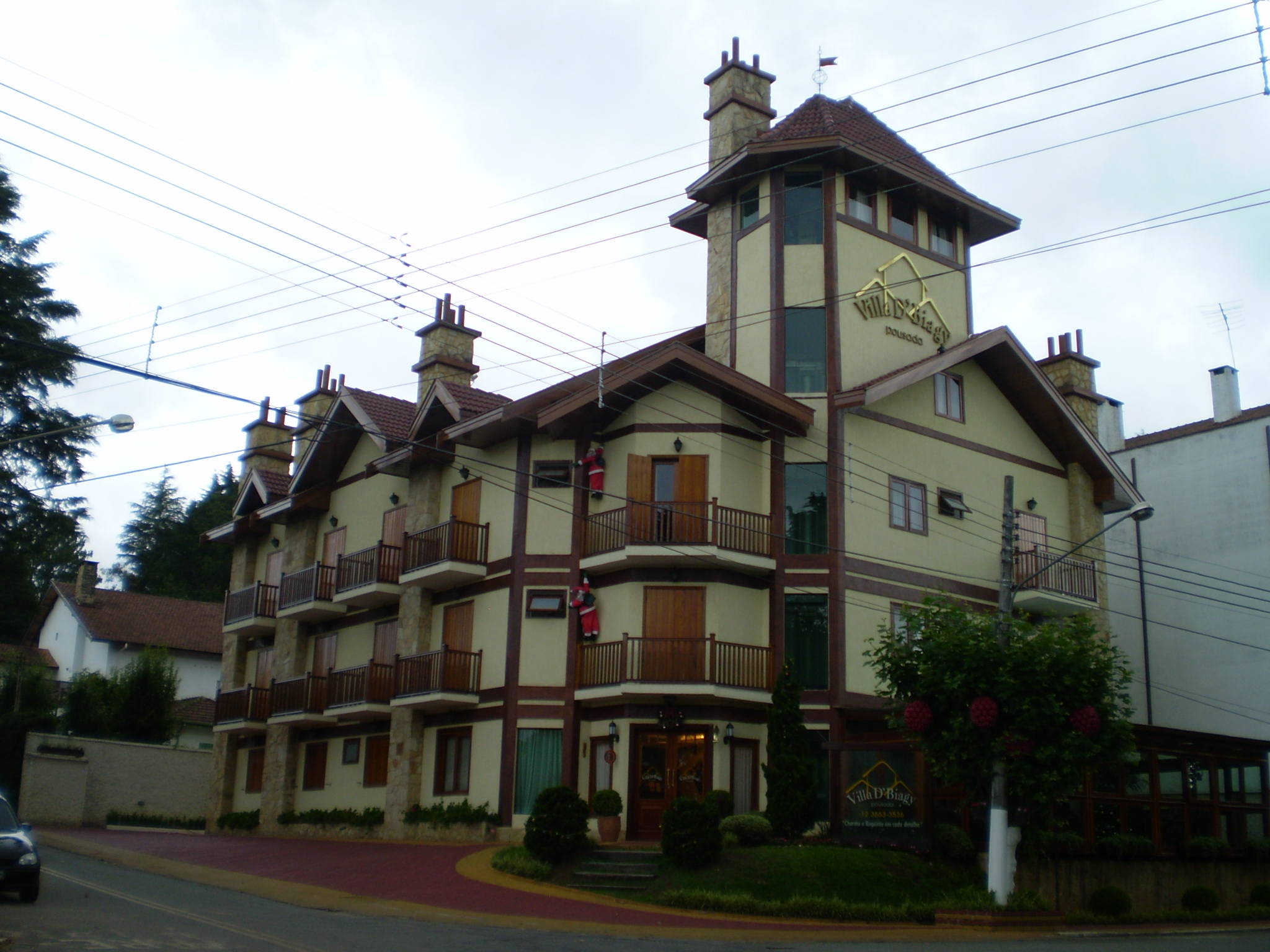
The Villa D'Biagy Inn in Campos do Jordão, Brazil

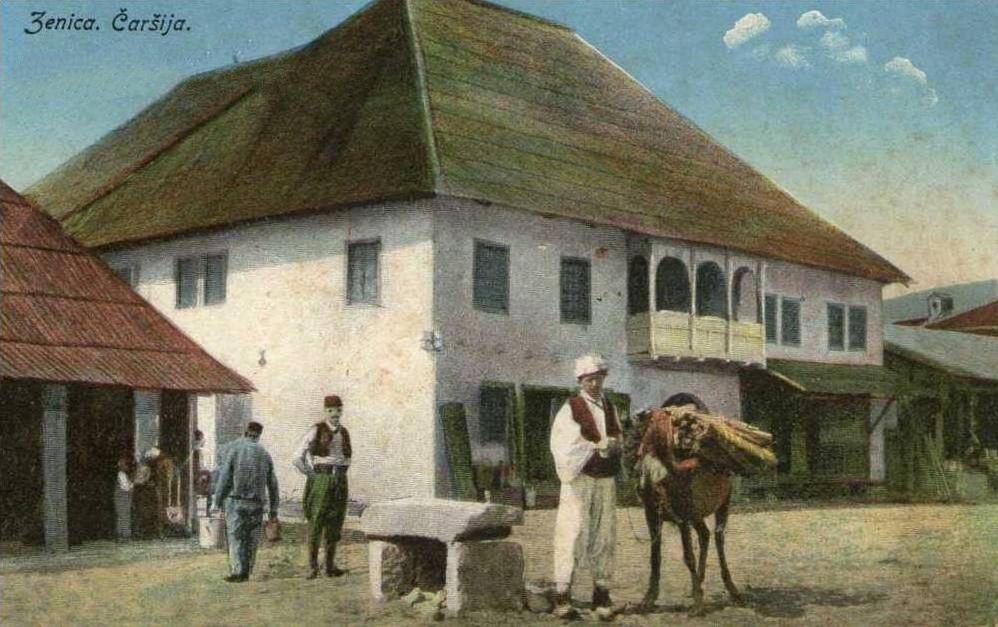
Serdarević's Inn, across present-day Hadži Mazića house in Old Čaršija street in Zenica, Bosnia and Herzegovina

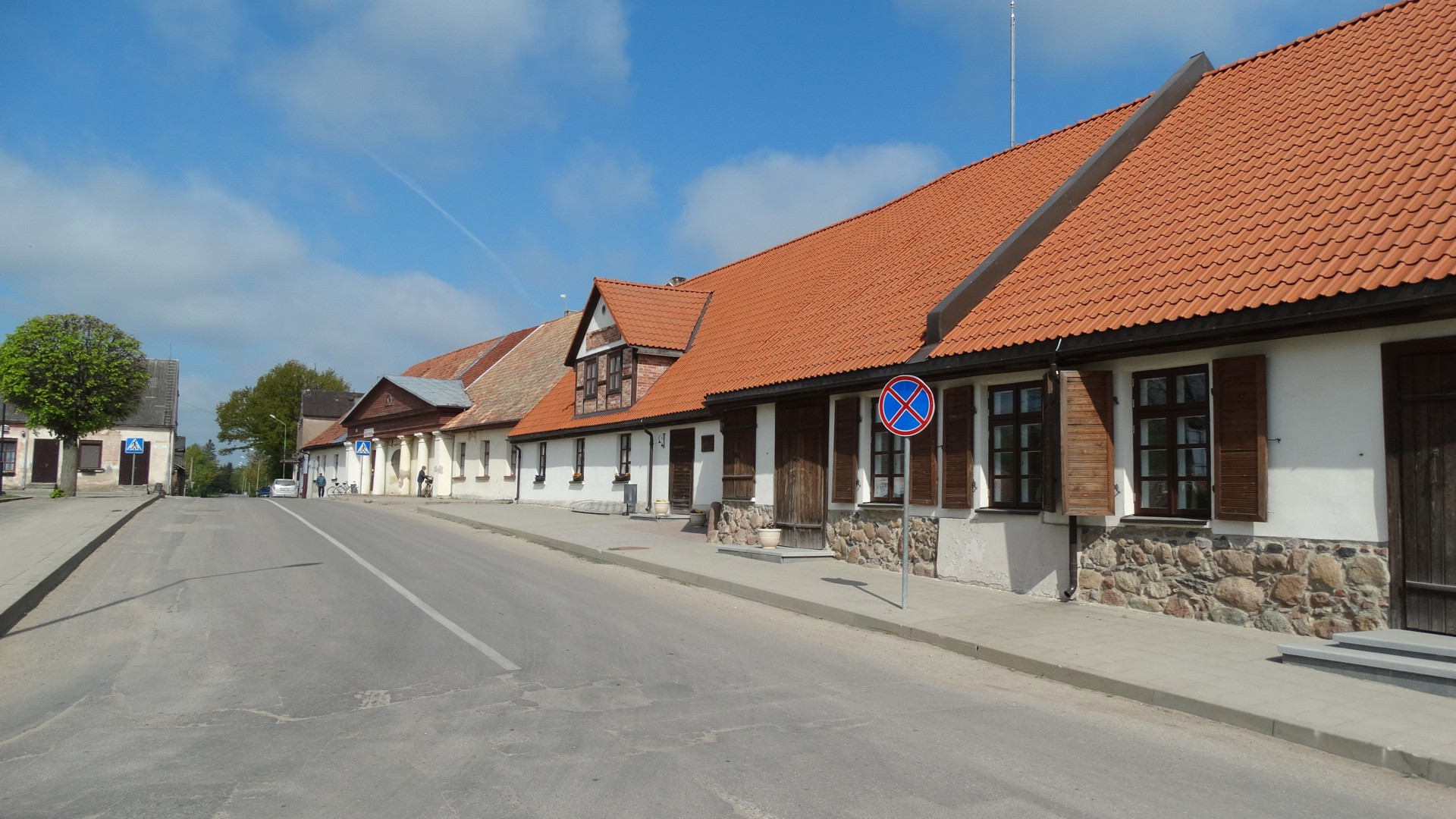
A row of historic inns in Žeimelis, northern Lithuania

== See also ==
- Bed and breakfast
- Caravanserai, the Middle Eastern equivalent
- Hostel
- Hostler, a groom who takes care of a traveler's horse
