= USS Jamestown (PG-55) =

Gunboat of the United States Navy

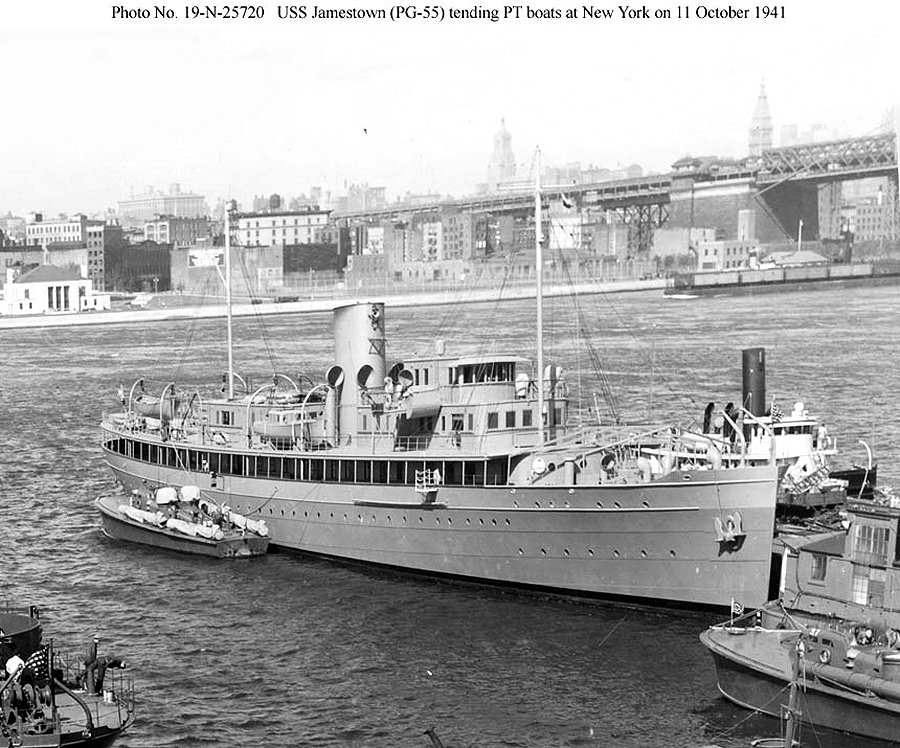
- USS Jamestown (PG-55)

History

United States
- Name: Jamestown
- Namesake: Settlement of Jamestown, Virginia
- Ordered: as Savarona
- Laid down: date unknown
- Launched: 1928
- Acquired: 6 December 1940
- Commissioned: 26 May 1941
- Decommissioned: 6 March 1946
- Stricken: date unknown
- Fate: Sold, 16 December 1946

General characteristics
- Displacement: 1,780 tons
- Length: 294 ft (90 m)
- Beam: 38 ft 2 in (11.63 m)
- Draught: 16 ft (4.9 m)
- Speed: 15 knots (28 km/h)
- Complement: 259
- Armament: Two 3"/50 caliber guns, six 20mm AA guns

USS Jamestown (PG-55) was a patrol gunboat and after 13 January 1943 a Jamestown-class motor torpedo boat tender acquired by the U.S. Navy during World War II. Her task in her final classification was to provide a "home base" for torpedo boats in remote parts of the ocean during the war, and to provide them with necessary services, such as fuel, food, and repairs.

== Construction ==
Jamestown was built as Savarona in 1928, by Pusey & Jones Corp., Wilmington, Delaware, for Mrs. Thomas S. Cadwallader of Philadelphia, Pennsylvania. While Mrs. Cadwallader operated her, Savarona was said to be the largest and most luxurious yacht in the world. Colonel William Boyce Thompson purchased the palatial vessel in 1929, and renamed her Alder prior to his daughter donating the vessel to the U.S. Navy.

== Yacht acquired by the Navy ==
Alder was donated to the U.S. Navy at New York on 6 December 1940; converted into a gunboat in the Fletcher Division Shipyard of Bethlehem Shipbuilding Co., Hoboken, New Jersey; renamed Jamestown and designated PG-55; and commissioned at New York Navy Yard 26 May 1941.

== World War II operations ==
Jamestown's first summer in the Navy was devoted to training U.S. Naval Academy midshipmen. She sailed to Annapolis, Maryland, 1 June to embark her first detachment of 100 third-class men and 3 instructors for a 2-week training cruise to Norfolk, Virginia.

=== Conversion to motor torpedo boat tender ===
At the end of the summer, after completing a number of similar cruises, Jamestown steamed to New York to be fitted out as a motor-torpedo-boat tender. When final conversion was completed, she sailed to Melville, Rhode Island, to assist in establishing the Motor Torpedo Boat Training Center and to serve as training ship and tender for the boats of Squadron 4 while she readied herself for combat.

=== Transfer to the Pacific Theatre ===
In June 1942, she returned to New York to receive new equipment before departing for the South Pacific Ocean. Eager for action, the tender stood out of New York Harbor 1 August. While she steamed toward the New Hebrides Islands via the Panama Canal and Pearl Harbor, the Navy daringly launched its first offensive thrust against Japan by landing the 1st Marine Division on Guadalcanal and Tulagi.

=== Supplying Guadalcanal and Tulagi with fuel ===
The Navy's resources available for Operation Watchtower were meager at the outset of the fighting on 7 August but had dangerously weakened by combat losses in ensuing weeks of desperate fighting against heavy odds. In September, when Jamestown arrived in Espiritu Santo, the U.S. Marines on Guadalcanal were suffering from a critical shortage of supplies. While awaiting the arrival of the PT boats of Squadron 3, the tender busied herself escorting resupply convoys between the New Hebrides and Tulagi towing a barge carrying 2,000 barrels (320 m^{3}) of gasoline and 500 quarter-ton bombs.

=== Constant threat of Japanese gunfire ===
Jamestown was at Noumea, New Caledonia, 19 September when boats of the 1st Division of Squadron 3 arrived. Cargo ship Bellatrix assisted her in towing them to Espiritu Santo, where Jamestown entrusted them to two fast minesweepers for the final passage to Tulagi and resumed her efforts to keep vital supplies flowing through the enemy infested waters to the Marines on Guadalcanal. Finally she reported to Tulagi 22 October and there, in the center of the bitter struggle subject to constant air attack, began servicing the PT boats of Squadron 3. For the next 4 months these fearless little ships patrolled "Iron Bottom Sound" nightly, frequently challenging Japanese destroyers, cruisers, and even battleships of "the Tokyo Express". During the day Jamestown worked feverishly to ready the worn and battered boats for the next patrol. Besides ministering to the PT boats, the tender assisted with preliminary repairs to battle-damaged American cruisers and sent parties ashore to construct pipelines to water holes.

=== Included in Presidential Unit Citation ===
Jamestown and the PT boats of Squadron 3 were explicitly included in the Presidential Unit Citation awarded the 1st Marine Division for taking and holding strongly defended Japanese positions on Tulagi, Gavutu, Tanambogo, Florida Island, and Guadalcanal.

=== Redesignated AGP-3 ===
The tender was redesignated AGP-3 on 13 January 1943, and commenced operating under Commander Motor Torpedo Boat Squadron, U.S. Pacific Fleet. She departed Tulagi 18 February 1943 on one of countless trips made during the following year from that port to the New Hebrides or Rendova for supplies for the PT boats or acting as escort between island groups. After 12 months of this valuable service, Jamestown departed Tulagi 9 February 1944 for a well-earned and badly needed overhaul at San Pedro, California.

=== Stateside repairs and return to South Pacific ===
Back in tip-top shape she sailed from San Pedro 17 July and arrived Espiritu Santo 5 August. By this time the Solomons and the Bismarck Archipelago were secure; and the PT boats were needed in the Southwest Pacific, where General MacArthur was fighting for New Guinea. Jamestown found herself shuttling supplies, equipment, and supporting troops from the Solomons to bases in New Guinea. Her former role as a tender was now filled by larger ships designed specifically for the task. Jamestown proudly proved her worth as a utility ship maintaining communications between PT boat bases. For example, she departed Treasury Island 6 September 1944 to rendezvous at Bougainville with a troop transport which she escorted to Milne Bay, Dutch New Guinea, returning to Treasury Island a week later ready for a similar voyage escorting merchantmen to Finschhafen, Dutch New Guinea.

=== Supporting invasion of the Philippines ===
Ordered to the Philippines 5 February 1945, Jamestown arrived Leyte 12 February to mess and berth men of Motor Torpedo Squadron 24 until 18 March. Convoy duty between Samar and Woendi, Schouten Islands was followed by voyages to Borneo and various ports in the Philippines occupying the tender until after Japan surrendered.

== Post-war decommissioning ==
Jamestown departed Samar for the United States 20 October 1945 and arrived San Francisco, California, 24 November. She decommissioned there 6 March 1946 ending her busy and useful service and was transferred to the Maritime Commission for disposal 4 September 1946. She was sold to Balfour Gutrie and Co., Ltd., 16 December 1946.
