= Exeter Inn =

Building in New Hampshire, United States

Coordinates: 42°58′40″N 70°57′15″W

The Exeter Inn
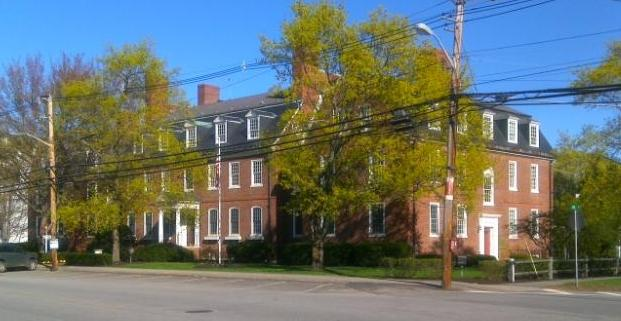
- Interactive map of the The Exeter Inn area
- Alternative names: The Inn at Exeter

General information
- Architectural style: Georgian
- Location: 90 Front Street, Exeter, New Hampshire, United States
- Opened: 1932
- Owner: Phillips Exeter Academy
- Landlord: Hay Creek Hotels

Technical details
- Floor count: 3

Other information
- Number of rooms: 43 guest rooms 3 suites

Website
- www.theexeterinn.com

The Exeter Inn is an inn located on the campus of Phillips Exeter Academy in Exeter, New Hampshire. It is owned by the academy and operated by leaseholder Hay Creek Hotels. The inn is an occasional stopover for candidates in the New Hampshire presidential primaries.

== History ==
A previous Exeter Inn had been located on Water Street. One of the town's oldest buildings, it was demolished in 1959.

The current Georgian style complex was built in 1932, funded by a donation from the widow and daughter of mining engineer and PEA alumnus William Boyce Thompson. It mirrors the school's architectural motif. It sits on land purchased for the academy in 1890 from PEA alumnus William P. Chadwick by Edward F. Gale and that year's graduating class.

Over the years, the inn has hosted events for several New Hampshire presidential primary candidates. In 2020, during the COVID-19 pandemic, the inn temporarily closed to visitors and was converted into additional housing for academy students.

In 1997, the academy transferred a 75-year lease to hotel operator Someplace(s) Different. Hay Creek Hotels acquired the lease in June 2007 and conducted a $5 million renovation, which upgraded the rooms, lobby, restaurant, and amenities.
