= W. B. Thompson Mansion =

Historic house in New York, United States

- U.S. National Register of Historic Places
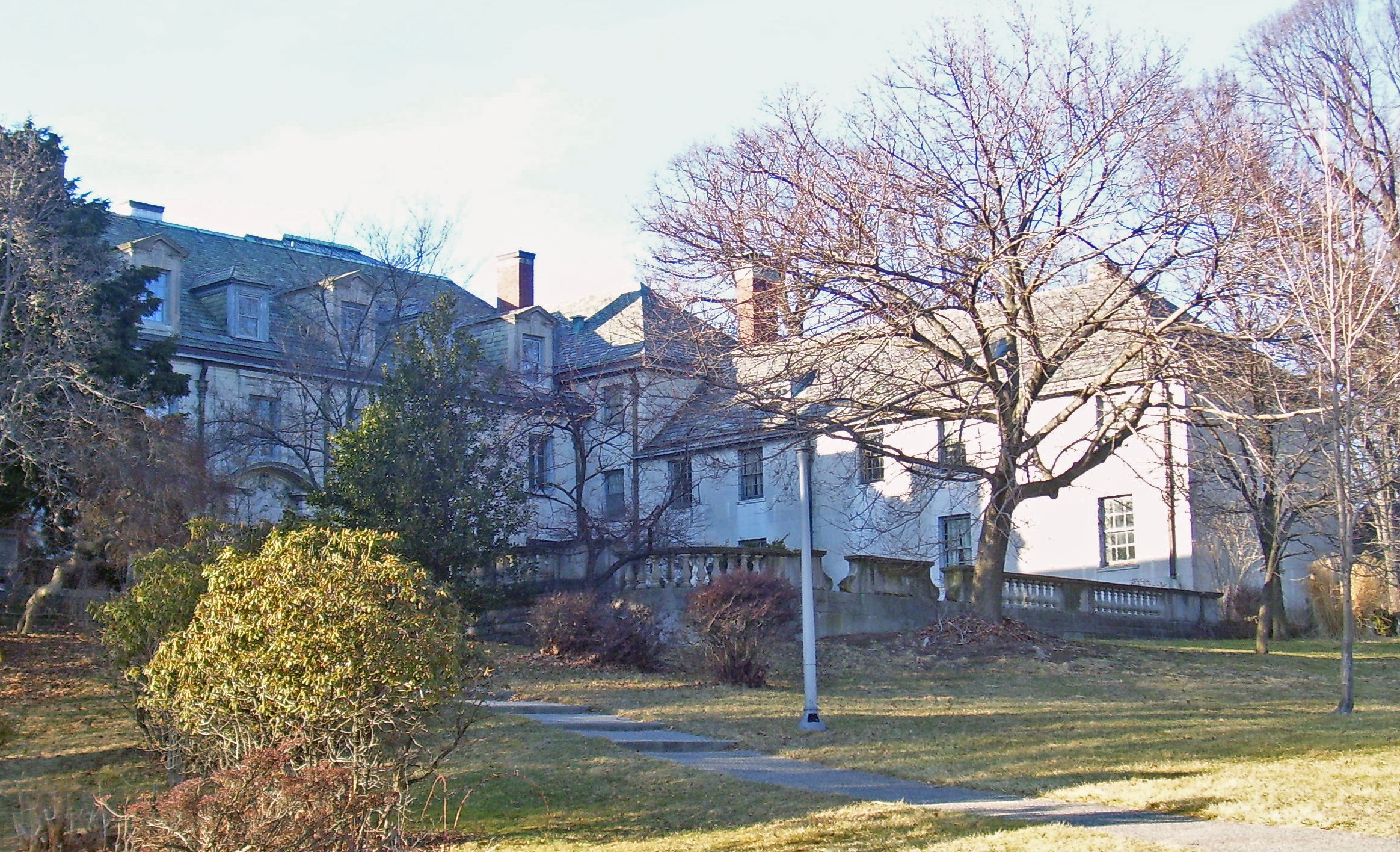
- East elevation, 2009

- Location within New York Location within the United States
- Location: Yonkers, New York
- Coordinates: 40°58′22″N 73°53′4″W
- Area: 1.5 acres (0.61 ha)
- Built: 1912
- Architect: Carrere & Hastings
- Architectural style: Renaissance Revival
- NRHP reference No.: 82001277
- Added to NRHP: October 29, 1982

The W. B. Thompson Mansion, also known as Alder Manor, is a historic home located on North Broadway (U.S. Route 9) in the Greystone section of Yonkers, New York, United States. It is an early 20th-century mansion designed by Carrère and Hastings in the Renaissance Revival architectural style. In 1982, it was listed on the National Register of Historic Places.

It was built by William Boyce Thompson, a mining tycoon and financier, as his weekend home. At the turn of the century, large riverside estates characterized much of Yonkers; today the Thompson Mansion is one of the few to have survived the city's 20th-century urbanization. The Thompson family lived there until the mid-20th century; afterwards it was willed to the Roman Catholic Archdiocese of New York and became Mary Elizabeth Seton High School, the first Catholic school in Yonkers.

After ten years as a high school, it was upgraded to a junior college. A few years after merging with Iona College, the campus was closed. While the other buildings on the property were repurposed, the mansion fell into neglect and was looted until Tara Circle, an Irish American cultural organization, bought it from the city. To raise money for its restoration, Tara Circle holds occasional events there and rents it out for weddings and filming for movies such as Mona Lisa Smile and A Beautiful Mind.

== Building and grounds ==
The mansion is located in the northwestern corner of Yonkers, on bluffs 300 feet (91 m) above the Hudson River a thousand feet (300 m) to the west. It is on the west side of North Broadway, set back 600 feet (180 m) from the road atop a slight rise, at the end of a curving driveway flanked by shrubs and small trees that ends in a paved forecourt with a stone balustrade. On the opposite side of North Broadway is the South Westchester Executive Park with taller modern buildings. To the north is the 39-acre (16 ha) Lenoir Nature Preserve, a Westchester County park. St. John's Riverside Hospital is on the south. The trailway along the Old Croton Aqueduct, a National Historic Landmark, passes through the woods next to the preserve on the steep slopes leading westward down to the river. At the river itself are some modern high-rise apartment buildings around the Greystone station on Metro-North Railroad's Hudson Line.

Around the house is extensive landscaping. There are terraces and sculpture gardens to the south. It is complemented on the north by a walled classically inspired garden with many authentic Roman artifacts. At its west end is a replica of the Theatre of Dionysus in Athens.

=== Exterior ===
The main building is a 2½-story seven-bay limestone structure on a full basement. Its main block is topped by a tiled hipped roof pierced by chimneys and alternating hipped and gabled dormer windows set with one-over-one double-hung sash. A small two-bay wing projects from the south. On the north end is a two-story service wing, itself with two small wings.

A brick terrace continuing the stone balustrade from the forecourt surrounds the building; there are loggias at the north and south ends. The north facade incorporates the facade of an actual 16th-century Italian church. All bays below the roof on the main block are set with multi-pane casement windows; the service wing's windows are six-over-six double-hung sash.

In the center of the west (rear) face is an elaborate garden entrance. At the first story three French doors are recessed in a Palladian arcade. Above them is an entablature and central arch flanked by oval windows and supported by a combination of pilasters and freestanding columns.

=== Interior ===
On the opposite side, a broken pediment above the segmental arched main entrance is supported by engaged columns. It has other classical detailing. Doors of glass and wrought iron open into a vestibule with marble floors and terra cotta bas-reliefs. The marble floors continue into the entrance hall, with a plaster ceiling designed by Thomas Hastings. All other floors are wooden parquet, with the exception of tile in the kitchen. Some of the doors retain their original Gorham knobs. Many of the original artwork and finishes also remain.

The drawing room has walnut panelling and bolection molding with carved birds, flowers and swags around the fireplace. Above it is a rare English-style trompe-l'œil ceiling. An Italian-style coffered ceiling is in the music room, complementing its imported 15th-century Italian stone fireplace. The dining room has French-style coffering; both it and the library have oak paneling and classically inspired carved white marble mantelpieces.

The stairwell is three stories high. The main stair has a carved iron and wood rail, and the walls feature pilasters, entablatures and railings, all forming low colonnades at each level. At the top organ pipes of a Welte Philharmonic Organ are arranged in the shape of a window frame.

What appears to be paneling along the walls of the upper stories is actually a line of closets. The master bedroom has another imported European fireplace; in the other bedrooms are more classically inspired carved ones. At the northern end of the second floor is a tiled indoor pool with a stained glass window looking out on the garden. The basement den has been extensively remodeled, but it still has an Asian design and a Chinese decorative wood carving along the stair leading to it.

== History ==
After success in the mining industry in his native Montana, William Boyce Thompson came to New York in 1895. He continued to be involved in mining as an investor on Wall Street, and made more money. A decade later, he began acquiring the 22 acres (8.9 ha) on which he built his mansion. Originally called Alder Manor after Alder Gulch, his hometown, since the cliffs of the Palisades across the river reminded him of the scenery there, it was intended to be a weekend residence.

He commissioned Carrère and Hastings to design the house. As a lover of plants and gardens, Thompson had supervised the planning and planting of the landscapes around the house, and retained considerable influence over it. While the house has many similarities with the Frick Mansion in New York City, which the firm was designing and building at the same time, the Thompson Mansion has some touches that reflect his personal preferences, such as the colored marble in some columns, imported fireplaces, and classical detailing in the gardens.

Thompson lived in the house until his death in 1930. He left $20 million ($306 million in 2025) in trust to his wife and daughter on condition that they continue to live at Alder Manor. Gertrude Thompson lived there for another 20 years. After her 1950 death, she willed it to the Archdiocese of New York, which decided to use it as a Catholic high school. The Sisters of Charity ran it as Mary Elizabeth Seton High School, Yonkers' first Catholic secondary school. In 1960 they upgraded it to a junior college.

At that time some modifications were made. The addition of a chapel and a fire escape were done discreetly, with great sensitivity to the architecture. On the inside, however, some rooms were modified extensively to serve as bedrooms and offices. Among these were the basement den, where Thompson had displayed his gem collection. Its Chinese-themed decor was greatly minimized, and only the woodwork remains today. The college also built a dorm to the west, blocking the view of the Hudson the mansion had once enjoyed.

In 1989, Elizabeth Seton College merged with Iona College. For a while Iona used both campuses, due to space limitations across the county at its New Rochelle campus. Six years after the merger, in 1995, Iona closed the campus and consolidated operations in New Rochelle. The property began to be subdivided and sold. It was attractive to developers since it was one of the few large mostly unbuilt parcels in Yonkers with river views. The city bought 14 acres (5.7 ha) including the mansion and other buildings, the latter of which it used as an elementary school. A developer bought the remaining land to the south and built an assisted living center.

The mansion remained unused and vacant. Signs of neglect became apparent, and it became a target for vandals and thieves. Among the items stolen were the brass nameplate at the main entrance, a chandelier and a Tiffany glass window. The city put out a request for proposals from interested parties.

Two years later, in 1997, it accepted a proposal from Tara Circle, an Irish American cultural organization, which had been looking for a permanent home for ten years. On June 16 of that year, it held its first event, a Bloomsday celebration. The mansion cost the group $1.2 million to acquire, and it was estimated that fully restoring it would take another $2 million.

Throughout the 2000s Tara Circle made limited use of the building due to its condition. It offers classes in Irish music and culture, and has hosted a concert by Ronan Tynan. Further revenue has been raised by renting the mansion for weddings and banquets, and film shoots. It was first used in that latter capacity as the mansion where Russell Crowe as mathematician John Nash drops mail off there in the 2001 film A Beautiful Mind. It was also used for scenes in The Royal Tenenbaums and Mona Lisa Smile.

== See also ==
- National Register of Historic Places listings in Yonkers, New York
