= William Boyce Thompson =

American mining engineer, financier, and philanthropist (1869–1930)

- Born: May 13, 1869; Virginia City, Montana, U.S.
- Died: June 27, 1930 (aged 61); Yonkers, New York, U.S.
- Resting place: Sleepy Hollow Cemetery
- Occupations: Mining engineer; financier; philanthropist
- Spouse: Gertrude Hickman

William Boyce Thompson (May 13, 1869 – June 27, 1930) was an American mining engineer, financier, prominent in the Republican party, philanthropist, and founder of Newmont Mining. Thompson was one of the early twentieth century mine operators that discovered and exploited vast copper deposits that revolutionized Western American mining, and reaped tremendous fortunes. The William Boyce Thompson School in Yonkers, New York, is named after him.

== History ==
Born in Virginia City, Montana Territory and raised in Butte, he was schooled in the rough mining towns of southwest Montana - but also at Phillips Exeter Academy and the Columbia School of Mines. During the 1890s he joined his father, William, one-time mayor of Butte, in Montana mining and lumber ventures, before moving east to become a mine promoter and stockbroker. His first success, the Shannon Copper Company – where he opened mines, built a smelter, and a railroad between them – is now part of Arizona's vast Morenci open pit, the largest in the United States. Joining the brokerage firm of Hayden, Stone & Co. during the early 1900s he expanded his promotions: to Ely, Nevada, where he helped organize the Nevada Consolidated, which eventually became a part of the multinational Kennecott Copper Company (Guggenheims), of which he was a director; Mason Valley where he opened old copper mines and built his smelter town which was named Thompson, Nevada after him (now a ghost town); and most fortuitously in the 1910s opened the Magma mine at Superior, Arizona, which became a major copper producer; and the promotion of the incredibly rich Inspiration Copper Company at Inspiration, Arizona, near Miami, Arizona, during the 1910s (absorbed by the "Anaconda crowd" in 1912, but with Thompson retaining a 15% share); all made him fabulously wealthy. He had built a considerable fortune developing low grade, large scale porphyry copper deposits at the same time he got lucky with his high-grade Magma mine, which proved a phenomenal bonanza. He retired from the New York Stock Exchange in 1915 and founded the Newmont Company in 1916; it was incorporated as Newmont Corporation in 1921, to which he transferred his many mining interests. By the time of his death, Newmont had become an influential mining investment company with substantial interests in copper production. Newmont later became one of the world's leading gold producers and continues the legacy of Thompson to explore and bring into production new ore deposits.

Thompson's promotions and financial holdings were scattered from Canada to Peru. They included Indian Motorcycle Co. He financed lead, zinc and coal mines, street railways, and handled the sensational Midvale Steel financing during the War when the stock rose from 290 to 500. He promoted the great Nipissing silver deposit at Cobalt, Ontario, Canada for the Guggenheims and reaped a quick million dollars return. He refinanced American Woolen Co. and Tobacco Products Co., launched Cuba Cane Sugar Co., got control of Pierce-Arrow Motor Car Co., organized Submarine Boat Corp. and the Wright-Martin Aeroplane Co. He was a director of the Metropolitan Life Insurance Company. By the 1920s he was a director of Sinclair Oil and promoter of Gulf Sulphur, but all these were diversions from his main interest in mining copper.

In 1925, when planning to scout mining properties in South Africa, he became ill and returned home halfway through the trip, his last, lingering illness. Rotund, good-natured, bald, a tireless worker, a devoted family man, Thompson chewed tobacco, underpaid his employees (though equivalent to pay given by his contemporaries) and, as one of the greatest gamblers of his time, discharged them for gambling.

He was prominent behind the scenes in the Republican party, a presidential elector, party chair, as well as served on the Federal Reserve Bank of New York from 1914 to 1919 and was twice (1916 and 1920) a delegate to the Republican National Convention. In 1921, he declined nomination for a cabinet post under President Warren G. Harding. He was head of and principal supporter of the President Theodore Roosevelt Memorial Association from 1919 until his death.

In 1912, he built the W. B. Thompson Mansion at Yonkers, New York. It was added to the National Register of Historic Places in 1982.

During the 1920s, near Superior, Arizona, he built his winter mansion, Picket Post House, overlooking the beautiful desertscape and gardens he created at what became the magnificent Boyce Thompson Arboretum. The Mediterranean style home is occasionally open for tours through the arboretum.

In 1925, Thompson ordered a luxurious private railroad car, named the Alder, from the Pullman Company. The car was later used by ASARCO and in 1971 was owned by the National Railways of Mexico.

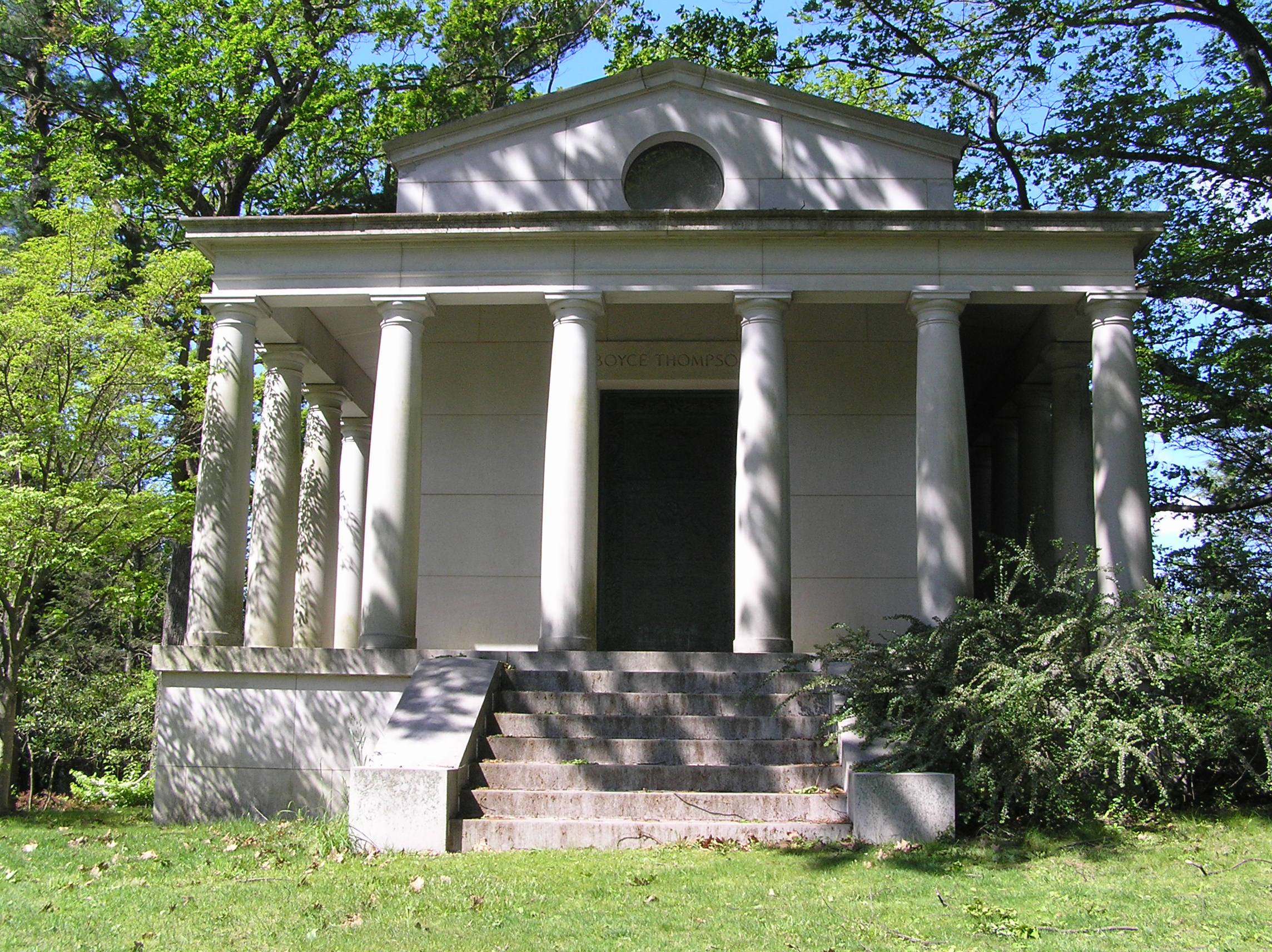
The mausoleum of William Boyce Thompson

Thompson died from pneumonia in 1930 and was buried at the Sleepy Hollow Cemetery. A 1935 biography of Boyce-Thompson, The Magnate, by Herman Hagedorn, the presidential biographer of Theodore Roosevelt, profiles his life.

His portrait was painted by the Swiss-born American artist Adolfo Müller-Ury (1862–1947) about 1920–5, and was donated to the New York Chamber of Commerce around 1948/9 by the artist's friend, the soprano Jessica Dragonette (died 1980) who had acquired it from the artist's estate; she claimed in her autobiography 'Faith is a Song' (1951) that she offered it to Thompson's daughter who set a fee for the privilege of destroying the portrait. The portrait is now in the New York State Museum at Albany.

=== Russia ===
Thompson visited Russia just after the February Revolution of 1917 which resulted in the abdication of Tsar Nicholas II. The effects of crop failure and starvation were rampant. Thompson was a member of an American Red Cross relief mission that also hoped to encourage the formation of a democratic government in Russia. He was awarded the honorary title of Colonel by the American Red Cross.

The objective of Thompson's mission was to enlarge the business opportunities in Russia for himself and his Wall Street associates. But on the ground in Russia, he saw firsthand the suffering of the people and the inability of the social democratic Provisional Government headed by Alexander Kerensky to handle the crisis and feed the hungry. Along with assisting the Provisional government in dealing with the famine, Thompson also endeavored to shape post-Revolutionary Russia's political landscape in a manner favorable to Wall Street. Thompson provided $1 million of his own money to fund a propaganda campaign to counteract Kerensky's mounting unpopularity, and growing popular sentiment against the ongoing war with the Central Powers.

With the help of Thompson, the Provisional Government created the Committee of Civic Education in Free Russia to oversee the propaganda drive, with pro-Kerensky Russian revolutionary Catherine Breshkovsky at the organization's head. According to W.B. Thompson biographer Hermann Hagedorn, the aim of the propaganda disseminated by the Committee was to "beg the Russians in terms which the simplest could comprehend to obey the government and resume the war, not to save the Allies but to save the Revolution." Despite Thompson's generous funding, the Committee was largely unsuccessful and could not compete with the anti-war propaganda of the Russian radicals, specifically that of the Bolsheviks. The million given to the Committee by Thompson was quickly exhausted, prompting Breshkovsky to appeal to U.S. President Woodrow Wilson for support. Thompson reached out to President Wilson himself, but failed to produce any further funding for the Committee. The Provisional government was overthrown in the October Revolution and the Bolsheviks came to power.

But this did not prove to be an immediate set-back in Thompson's plans for Russia. Thompson and his compatriot Raymond Robins attempted to deal with the new Bolshevik government despite the protests of indignant American diplomats and businessmen that the Bolsheviks were merely paid agents of the German Kaiser and not true representatives of Russian democracy. Based on his own observations of Russia's political climate, Thompson believed that the new Bolshevik government was certain to remain in power, and that official Allied recognition & support of the Bolsheviks could keep channels of trade open and influence the Bolsheviks to be less radical. According to him, "if [we] leave Russian radicalism to itself to grow like a cancer, it is going to be a menace to the world." Thompson argued that the Bolsheviks would "soon learn that capital and labor must go hand in hand" and continue the war against Germany.

Nevertheless, Thompson's predictions did not come true. The Bolsheviks withdrew from the war, ratifying the Treaty of Brest-Litovsk in 1918. While the Soviet Union allowed foreign investments and free trade for a time during the era of the New Economic Policy, this accommodation ended when Joseph Stalin took power and inaugurated the first five-year plans for the national economy of the Soviet Union.

There is a persistent narrative, most prominently outlined in "Wall Street and the Bolshevik Revolution" by Antony Sutton that W.B. Thompson gave considerable sums of money to the Bolsheviks. This is a misconception that can be traced back to Thompson's own time, originally appearing in newspapers asserting his support for the Bolsheviks. As pointed out by W.B. Thompson biographer Hermann Hagedorn, when the press uncovered Thompson's financial support for Kerensky and the Committee of Civic Education in Free Russia, they "jumped to the conclusion that he [actually] had given the money to the Bolsheviki for propaganda purposes" likely because of Thompson's unpopular public opinions on the Bolsheviks and their role in the future of Russia.

== Philanthropy ==
=== Plant research ===
In 1920, he decided to establish the Boyce Thompson Institute, and endowed it with $10 million, a veritable fortune in the 1920s. He hoped that this "seed" money would enable the institute to acquire the very best scientists, equipment, and supplies and then to develop relationships with industry and the government to help finance research.

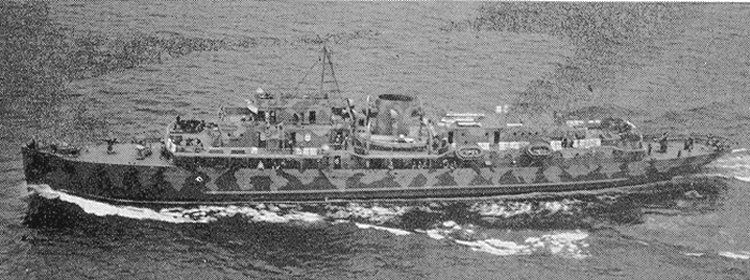
The yacht Alder after being converted to USS Jamestown (PG-55) in 1941. Photo c. 1943.

=== Other causes ===
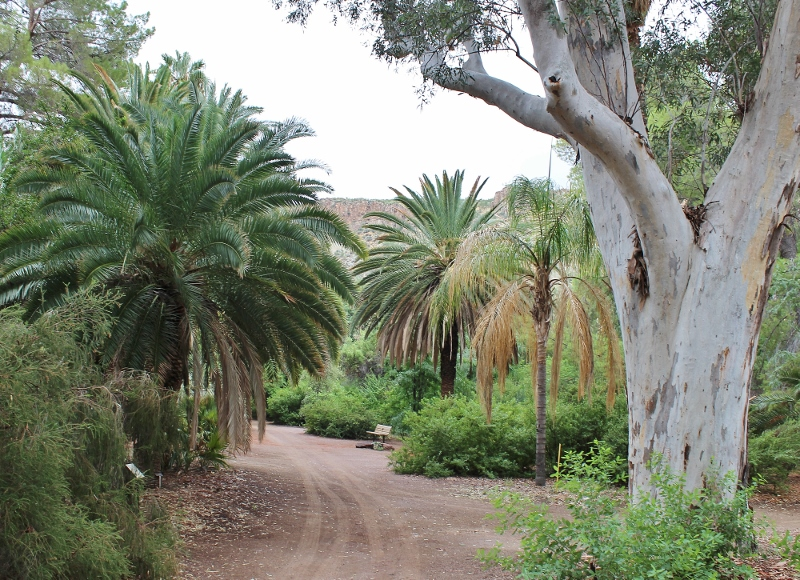
Boyce Thompson Arboretum trail, Superior, Arizona

He donated money for parks and libraries at many of his mining camps, including the Thompson-Hickman Memorial Library in his birthplace, Virginia City; his wife Gertrude Hickman Thompson officially transferred the building to the city in 1918. He donated $50,000 for a park in Butte.

To his alma mater, Phillips Exeter Academy, Thompson donated $2 million during his lifetime. His donations created the Boyce Thompson science building, a new gymnasium in 1923, squash courts, a baseball field, sports cage, The Exeter Inn, and other facilities. He willed $1 million to Phillips Exeter.

Thompson established the Boyce Thompson Arboretum just west of Superior, Arizona in 1924. It has grown into the largest botanical garden in the state of Arizona, and is one of the oldest botanical institutions west of the Mississippi River. Thompson owned rich copper mines in both Superior and Inspiration, Arizona.

Thompson also bequeathed a significant gem and mineral collection to New York's American Museum of Natural History.

His wife, Gertrude Hickman, and daughter, Margaret Thompson, inherited the balance of his wealth. In 1941, The Alder, Boyce-Thompson's 265 ft. motor-yacht, was given to the U.S. Navy to aid the war effort.

== Boyce-Thompson family ==
The Boyce-Thompson family listed by ancestry/generation:

- William Boyce Thompson (1869–1930) (m. Gertrude Hickman)
  - Margaret Thompson Biddle (1897–1956) (1st m. 1916 Theodore Schulze II div. unk.) (2nd m. 1931 Anthony Joseph Drexel Biddle, Jr. div. 1936)
    - Theodore Schulze III (1920–1962) (m. Joyce Ward)
      - Joyce Schulze (1950-2015)

    - Margaret "Peggy" Boyce Schulze (1921–1964) (1st m. 1939 Prince Alexander zu Hohenlohe-Waldenburg-Schillingsfürst) (2nd m. Morton Downey)
      - Catherine Hohenlohe (1942)
      - Christian-Conrad Hohenlohe (1945)

== Legacy ==
- Boyce Thompson Arboretum State Park - Sonoran Desert Arboretum
- Boyce Thompson Institute
- Thompson Park, Butte, Montana

Fortunately for future historians, Thompson began writing his reminiscences before his death. However, a word of caution about Hermann Hagedorn's The Magnate, William Boyce Thompson and His Time (1935) based on this material. Journalist Hagedorn at times writes more hagiography than biography. For example, his depiction of George E. Gunn is libelous—Gunn was not a lowly miner/prospector born in Nevada and working in Montana when "discovered" by Thompson as a worthy partner. Gunn, an Ohian who attended Oberlin and Ohio State University, had worked his way up to mine superintendent when he met Thompson in Helena. The two later became a powerful team (not as Hagedorn writes) after they met again while Gunn was with Guggenheim Exploration, mine finders, and Thompson with Hayden, Stone & Company brokerage. Their Gunn-Thompson partnership was searching in all the major new porphyry districts and developed a number of the major mines by the time heart disease impacted Gunn's abilities, then his death a year later March 11, 1913. Gunn the mine finder was a perfect match for Thompson the broker and high wheeling financier. Gunn had the talent in Salt Lake City on his staff or as consultants next door to find the mines—Mason Valley, Inspiration, Magma, for example—while Thompson had the connections to finance the developments. Again, many of the tall tales Hagedorn relates about the pre-1913 era, especially about Gunn, need correctives: Gunn's eyes were not gray they were blue and one needs to discount the rest of Hagedorn's description of his intellect and appearance; he was not buried by an ex-con and the boys, but by the Masonic lodge he had long been a member of and by a reverend, Hagedorn to the contrary. Same could be said of Hagedorn's depictions of and roles of Philip Wiseman, Henry Krumb, Fred Flindt, Walter Aldridge and others. For a more balanced but still dated account see A. B. Parsons, The Porphyry Coppers.
