= Edmund Whalen =

American prelate of the Catholic Church (born 1958)

His Excellency, The Most Reverend Edmund Whalen
- Auxiliary Bishop of New York; Titular Bishop of Cemerianus
- Archdiocese: New York
- Appointed: October 10, 2019
- Installed: December 10, 2019
- Other post: Titular Bishop of Cemerianus

Orders
- Ordination: June 23, 1984 by John O'Connor
- Consecration: December 10, 2019 by Timothy M. Dolan, Henry J. Mansell, and Gerald Thomas Walsh

Personal details
- Born: July 6, 1958 (age 68) Staten Island, New York
- Education: Cathedral College of the Immaculate Conception; Pontifical Gregorian University; Pontifical Lateran University
- Motto: Walk humbly with God

Styles of Edmund Whalen
- Reference style: His Excellency; The Most Reverend
- Spoken style: Your Excellency
- Religious style: Bishop

Edmund James Whalen (born July 6, 1958) is an American prelate of the Catholic Church who has been serving as an auxiliary bishop of the Archdiocese of New York since 2019.

== Biography ==
=== Early life ===
Edmund Whalen was born July 6, 1958, in Staten Island, New York. He attended Blessed Sacrament Church and School and Monsignor Farrell High School, both in Staten Island. He later entered the Cathedral College of the Immaculate Conception in Queens, New York.

Whalen traveled to Rome to further his studies, receiving a Bachelor of Sacred Theology degree from the Pontifical Gregorian University in 1984. He was ordained as a transitional deacon at St. Peter's Basilica in Rome on April 14, 1983. Whalen then spent time serving at a mission in the Diocese of Kakamega in Kenya.

=== Priesthood ===
On June 23, 1984, Whalen was ordained to the priesthood at St. Patrick's Cathedral in Manhattan by future Cardinal John O'Connor for the Archdiocese of New York. After his ordination, the archdiocese briefly assigned him as parochial vicar for Resurrection Parish in Rye, New York. He then returned to Rome to finish a Licentiate of Sacred Theology from the Alphonsian Academy at the Pontifical Lateran University.

After coming back to New York in 1985, Whalen was assigned again at Resurrection Parish. In 1987, he was also named as a teacher at Monsignor Farrell High School. O’Connor appointed Whalen as his priest-secretary in 1990. He entered the doctoral program at the Alphonsian Academy, receiving a Doctor of Sacred Theology degree in 1995.

After returning to New York, Whalen started teaching moral theology at St. Joseph’s Seminary in Yonkers, New York. He was named vice rector of St. Joseph's in 1997. In 1998, he left St. Joseph's to become rector at the St. John Neumann Seminary Residence in the Bronx. In 2001, the archdiocese named Whalen as pastor at St. Benedict Parish in the Bronx, serving there for the next six years. In 2010, Whalen was named principal of Monsignor Farrell.

=== Auxiliary Bishop of New York ===
Pope Francis appointed Whalen as an auxiliary bishop of New York on October 10, 2019. He was consecrated at St. Patrick's Cathedral by Cardinal Timothy Dolan on December 10, 2019, with Archbishop Henry J. Mansell and Bishop Gerald Thomas Walsh serving as co-consecrators.

== See also ==
- Hierarchy of the Catholic Church
- Catholic Church in the United States
- Historical list of the Catholic bishops of the United States
- List of Catholic bishops of the United States
- Lists of patriarchs, archbishops, and bishops
