= Peter John Byrne =

American Catholic prelate (born 1951)

His Excellency, The Most Reverend Peter John Byrne
- Auxiliary Bishop Emeritus of New York
- Church: Catholic Church
- Archdiocese: New York
- Appointed: June 14, 2014
- Installed: August 4, 2014
- Retired: October 5, 2026
- Other posts: Titular Bishop of Cluain Iraird (2014–); Pastor, Church of the Blessed Sacrament, Staten Island (2022–)

Orders
- Ordination: December 1, 1984 by John Joseph O'Connor
- Consecration: August 4, 2014 by Timothy Dolan, Gerald Thomas Walsh, and Dominick John Lagonegro

Personal details
- Born: July 24, 1951 (age 75) Manhattan, New York
- Education: Fordham University; St. Joseph's Seminary
- Motto: Deus est fidelis (Latin for 'God is faithful')
- Styles
- Reference style: His Excellency; The Most Reverend
- Spoken style: Your Excellency
- Religious style: Bishop

Peter John Byrne (born July 24, 1951) is an American Catholic prelate who served as an auxiliary bishop of the Archdiocese of New York in New York from 2014 to 2026.

== Biography ==
=== Early life ===
Byrne was born on July 24, 1951, in Manhattan, New York, the son of John and Dorothy Byrne. He grew up in Stuyvesant Town and attended Immaculate Conception School Elementary School and Cardinal Hayes High School in The Bronx. Bryne earned a bachelor's degree from Fordham University in New York City in history and social studies.

In 1974, Byrne entered St. Joseph's Seminary in Yonkers, New York, to begin his formation as a priest. However, having some doubts about his career choice, he took a leave of absence from the seminary in 1977. From 1977 to 1984, Byrne taught at Holy Name of Jesus Elementary School in Valhalla, New York, and at Bishop Ford Central Catholic High School in Brooklyn, New York. In 1983, Byrne returned to St. Joseph's to complete the program.

=== Priesthood ===
Byrne was ordained a priest at St. Patrick's Cathedral in Manhattan for the Archdiocese of New York by Cardinal John O'Connor on December 1, 1984.

After his ordination, the archdiocese assigned Byrne as parochial vicar at St. Teresa of Avila Parish in Sleepy Hollow, New York. He was transferred in 1984 to St. Thomas Aquinas Parish in the Bronx to serve as administrator there. In 1995, he briefly served as administrator at St. John the Baptist de La Salle Parish in Staten Island, New York.

Byrne then served as pastor at Immaculate Conception Parish on Staten Island from 1995 to 2013. After the attacks on the World Trade Center on September 11, 2001, Byrne worked for several weeks with families that lost relatives in Lower Manhattan. Byrne served at St. Elizabeth's Parish in Washington Heights, Manhattan from 2013 to 2014.

=== Auxiliary Bishop of New York ===
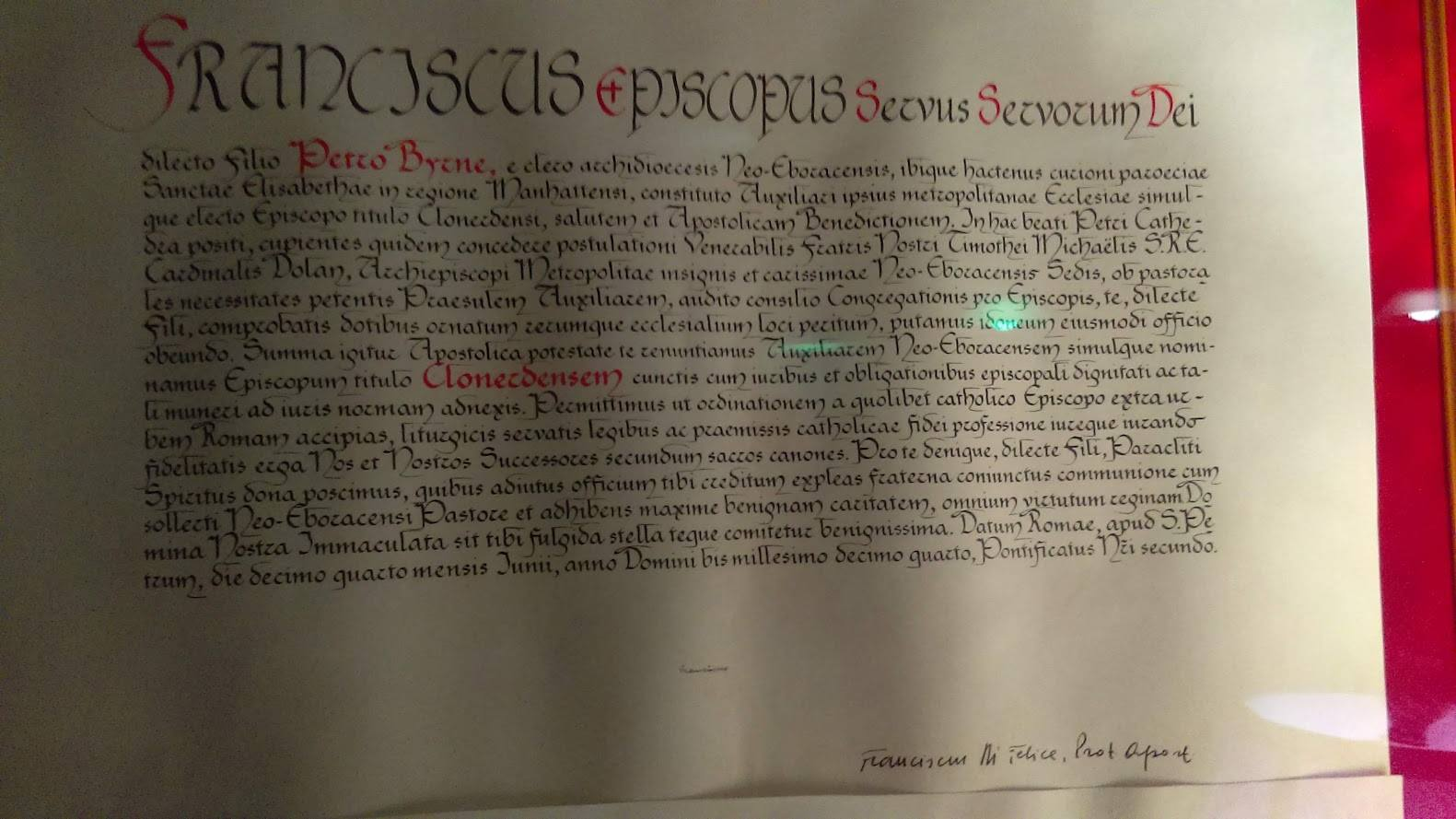
Papal Bull signed by Pope Francis naming Byrne as a Bishop

Byrne was named the titular bishop of Cluain Iraird and auxiliary bishop of the Archdiocese of New York by Pope Francis on June 14, 2014. He was consecrated a bishop by Cardinal Timothy Dolan in St. Patrick's Cathedral on August 4, 2014. New York auxiliary bishops Gerald Walsh and Dominick Lagonegro were the co-consecrators. Byrne chose as his episcopal motto "God is Faithful".

In 2022, Byrne co-celebrated with Bishop John Joseph O'Hara a red mass for members of the legal profession at Blessed Sacrament Church in West Brighton on Staten Island.

In May 2023, Byrne participated in the maiden voyage of a new Staten Island Ferry boat, the Dorothy Day. The boat was named after the Servant of God Dorothy Day, a founder of the Catholic Worker Movement in 1933 and an advocate for the poor.

On October 5, 2026, Pope Leo XIV accepted his resignation as auxiliary bishop of New York.

== See also ==
- Catholic Church hierarchy
- Catholic Church in the United States
- Historical list of the Catholic bishops of the United States
- List of Catholic bishops of the United States
- Lists of patriarchs, archbishops, and bishops

== Episcopal succession ==
Catholic Church titles
Preceded by –	Auxiliary Bishop of New York; 2014–2026	Succeeded by –
