= Joseph A. Espaillat =

American Catholic prelate (born 1976)

His Excellency, The Most Reverend Joseph A. Espaillat
- Auxiliary Bishop of New York
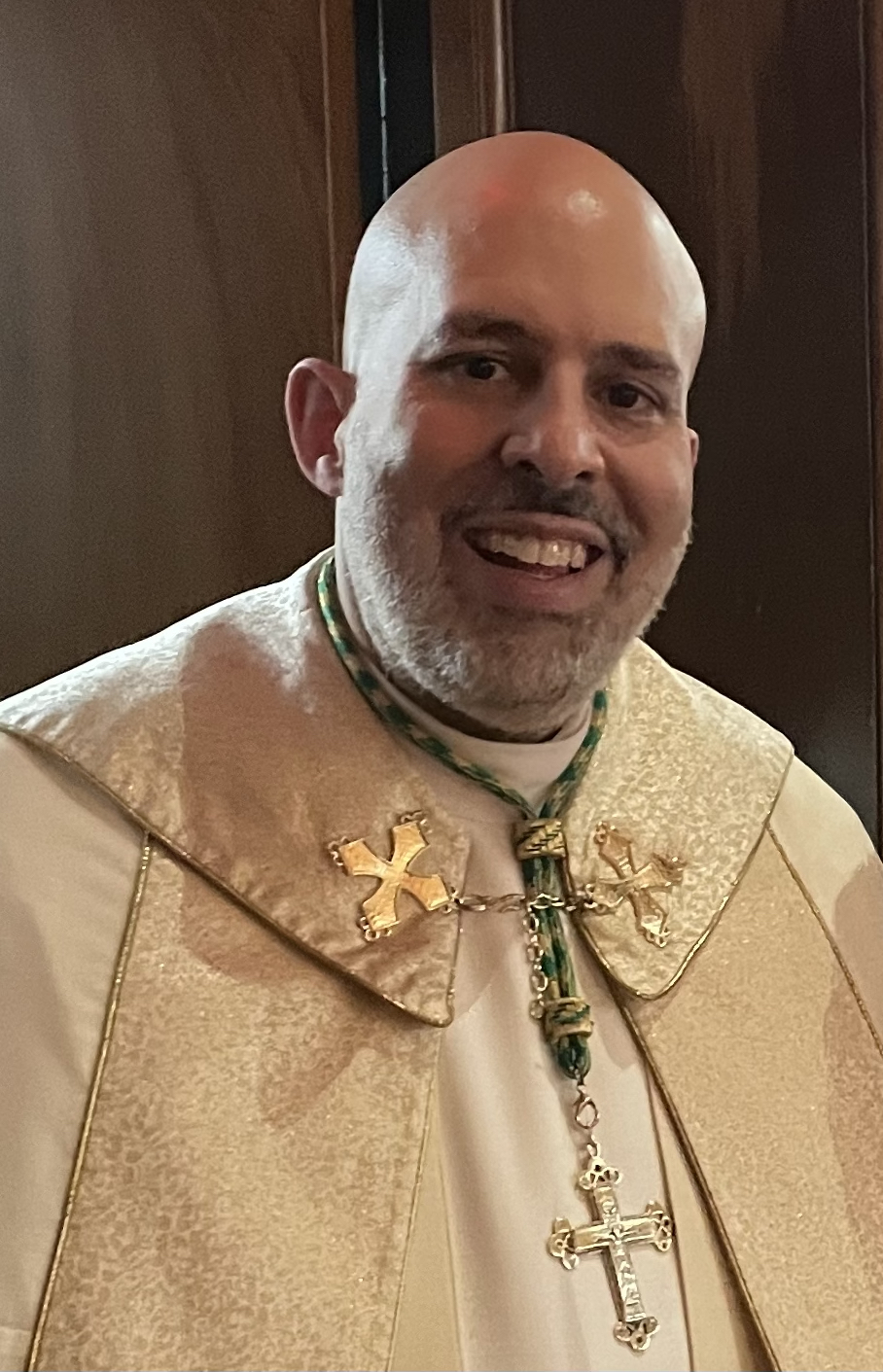
- Espillat in 2024, after preaching at an Adoration service for the National Eucharistic Revival at Cardinal Hayes High School in the Bronx.
- Archdiocese: New York
- Appointed: January 25, 2022
- Other posts: Titular Bishop of Tagarbala; Pastor, St. Anthony of Padua Church

Orders
- Ordination: May 17, 2003 by Edward Egan
- Consecration: March 1, 2022 by Timothy M. Dolan, John Joseph O'Hara, Gerald Thomas Walsh

Personal details
- Born: December 27, 1976 (age 49) New York City, New York, US
- Education: Fordham University; St. Joseph's Seminary
- Motto: He knows what He is about
- Styles
- Reference style: His Excellency; The Most Reverend
- Spoken style: Your Excellency
- Religious style: Bishop

Joseph Armando Espaillat II (born December 27, 1976) is a Dominican American Catholic prelate serving as an auxiliary bishop of the Archdiocese of New York since 2022.

== Biography ==
=== Early life ===
Joseph Armando Espaillat II was born on December 27, 1976, in New York City, the son of José and Mercedes Baez. His parents had immigrated to Manhattan from the Dominican Republic; the USCCB's African-American secretariat has described him as being of partial African descent. Espaillat attended high school at Cathedral Preparatory School in Manhattan. He later entered Fordham University in New York City, receiving a Bachelor of Arts in philosophy in 1998.

=== Priesthood ===
On May 17, 2003, Espaillat was ordained to the priesthood at St. Patrick's Cathedral in Manhattan by Cardinal Edward Egan for the Archdiocese of New York.

After his ordination, the archdiocese assigned Espaillat as parochial vicar at Our Lady of Martyrs Parish in Washington Heights in Manhattan. That same year, he was awarded a Master of Divinity degree in theology and a Master of Arts degree in theology, with an emphasis on church history, from St. Joseph's Seminary in Yonkers, New York.

In 2007, Espaillat was moved from Our Lady to become parochial vicar, then administrator of St. Peter's Parish in Yonkers; he was named pastor there in 2009. In 2012, Cardinal Timothy Dolan appointed Espaillat as director of youth ministry for the archdiocese. In 2015, Espaillat was named pastor of St. Anthony of Padua Catholic Parish in the Bronx, New York. Espaillat was also the director of the Hispanic Catholic Charismatic Center in the Bronx and the spiritual director of the Hispanic Charismatic Renewal of the archdiocese.

=== Auxiliary Bishop of New York ===
Pope Francis appointed Espaillat as an auxiliary bishop of New York on January 25, 2022. Espaillat was consecrated as a bishop at St. Patrick's Cathedral by Cardinal Timothy Dolan on March 1, 2022, with bishops John O'Hara and Gerald Walsh acting as co-consecrators. At age 45, Espaillat became the youngest Catholic bishop in the United States and one of the youngest in the world.

== See also ==
- Catholic Church hierarchy
- Catholic Church in the United States
- Historical list of the Catholic bishops of the United States
- List of Catholic bishops of the United States
- Lists of patriarchs, archbishops, and bishops

== Episcopal succession ==
Catholic Church titles
Preceded by –	Auxiliary Bishop of New York; 2022–present	Succeeded by –
