= St. Anthony of Padua Church (Bronx) =

Building in New York City, United States

Church of St. Anthony of Padua (Bronx, New York)
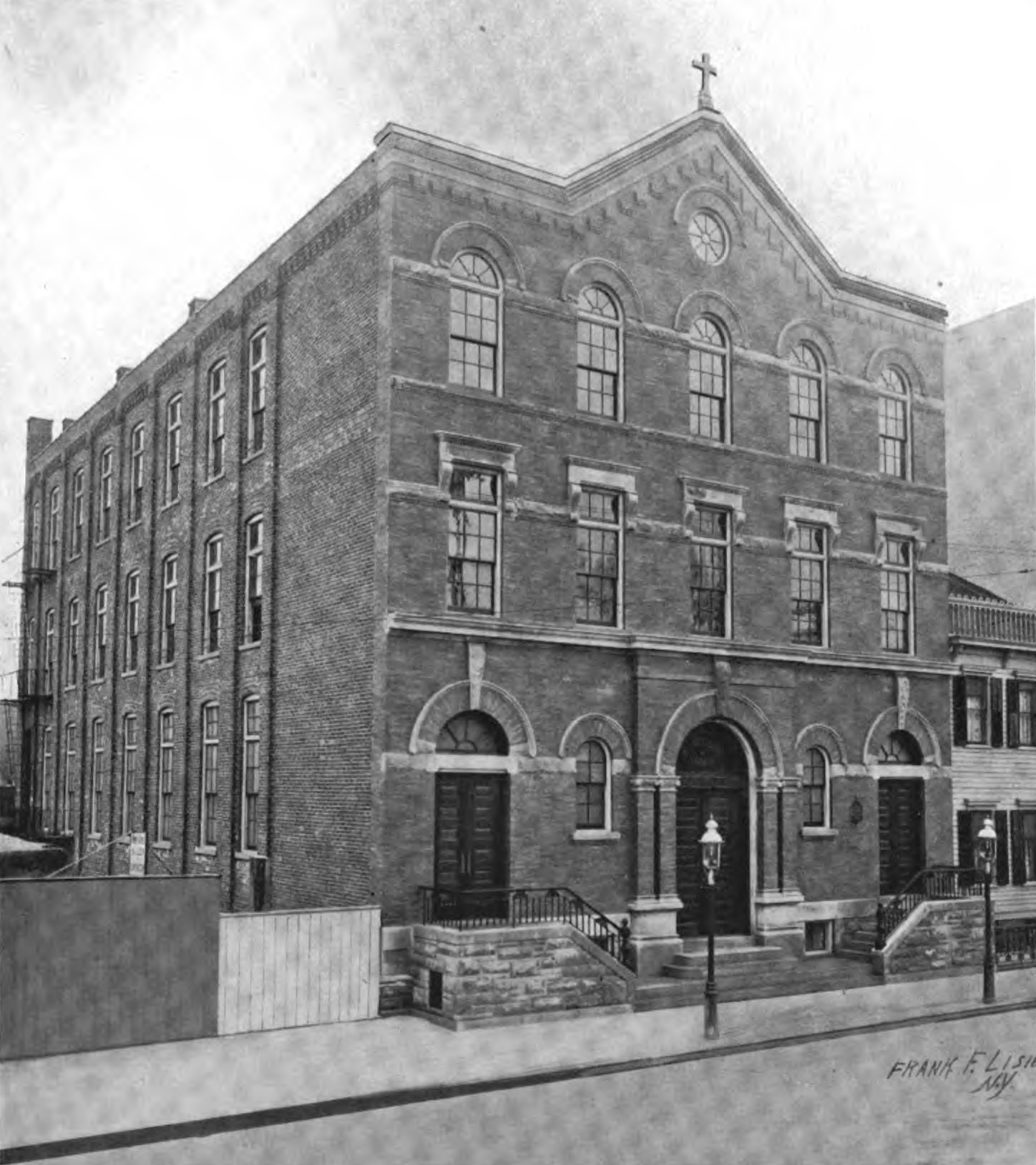
- (1904)
- Interactive map of the Church of St. Anthony of Padua (Bronx, New York) area

General information
- Architectural style: Romanesque Revival (for present church); Italianate (for 1904 church-hall-convent)
- Location: Morrisania, Bronx, New York City, U.S.
- Coordinates: 40°49′32″N 73°53′58″W
- Construction started: May 1904 (for church-hall-convent); 1927 (for present church)
- Completed: May 1905 (for church-hall-convent); June 10, 1928 (for present church)
- Cost: $70,000 (for 1904-1905 church-hall-convent and rectory).
- Client: Roman Catholic Archdiocese of New York

Technical details
- Structural system: Masonry brick

St. Anthony of Padua Church is a Catholic parish church in the Archdiocese of New York, located at 822 East 166th Street, Bronx, New York City in the neighborhood of Morrisania, near Prospect Avenue.

The present church was built through the concerted efforts of former pastor Joseph Rummel (1876-1964), who was elevated as Bishop of Omaha (1928-1935) and in that capacity consecrated the church.

== History ==
The parish was established in 1903 as the German national parish in the Bronx, the penultimate founding of a German National Parish in the Archdiocese of New York. Property was purchased on East 166th Street for $24,000 in November 1903. Thereafter property to the rear was purchased for a timber-framed rectory was purchased for $15,000.

The pastor of nearby St. John of Chrysostom Church opposed the new parish's founding because nearly all of the Germans were fluent in English. Nevertheless, the German-Americans wanted their own church. A parish of the same dedication in Manhattan, St. Anthony of Padua's Church (Manhattan), (established in 1866) was declared the national parish of the Italian-American community in Manhattan.

The pastor of the Bronx church, Joseph F. Rummel, raised funds totaling $300,000 to build a new edifice. His campaign was successful and the present church was built from 1927 to 1928. Rummel dedicated the building on June 10, 1928, having been appointed Bishop of Omaha earlier that year.

No longer German, the parish became significantly Black during the Great Migration and was mostly Latino as of 2011.

== Buildings ==
The first purpose-built church was a combination of church-and-school-and-convent structure, built 1904–1905, and dedicated by Cardinal Farley. The three-story-over-basement brick Italianate structure housed the church on the first floor, church hall in the basement, and 5 classrooms on the second floor, with the third floor given over to additional classrooms and convent rooms. The rectory address is 832 East 166 St., Bronx NY 10459.

== Pastors ==
- Otto F. Strack (1903)
- Joseph F. Rummel
- Joseph A. Espaillat
