= Josu Iriondo =

Spanish-born American prelate

His Excellency, The Most Reverend Josu Iriondo
- Auxiliary Bishop Emeritus of New York; Titular Bishop of Alton
- Church: Roman Catholic Church
- Archdiocese: New York
- Appointed: October 30, 2001
- Installed: December 12, 2001
- Retired: February 1, 2014
- Other post: Titular Bishop of Alton

Orders
- Ordination: December 23, 1962 by Jaime Font y Andreu
- Consecration: December 12, 2001 by Edward Egan, Henry J. Mansell, and Robert Anthony Brucato

Personal details
- Born: December 19, 1938 (age 87) Legazpi, Spain
- Motto: Dominum et vivificantem (Lord and giver of life)

Styles of Josu Iriondo
- Reference style: His Excellency; The Most Reverend
- Spoken style: Your Excellency
- Religious style: Bishop

Josu Iriondo (born December 19, 1938) is a Spanish-born American prelate of the Roman Catholic Church who served as an auxiliary bishop of the Archdiocese of New York from 2001 to 2014.

== Biography ==
=== Early life and education ===
One of seven children, Josu Iriondo was born on December 19, 1938, in Legazpi, Spain, to Rufino and Maria Leona (née Zabaleta) Iriondo. He was educated in Spanish, but spoke Basque at home.

Iriondo decided to pursue the priesthood and then entered the minor seminary of the Canons Regular of the Lateran in Spain at age 12. He later joined the Canons Regular order, and attended Sagrado Corazon Seminary in Oñati, Spain and the Collegio San Vittore in Rome. From 1958 to 1962, Iriondo studied at the Pontifical Gregorian University in Rome.

=== Ordination and ministry ===
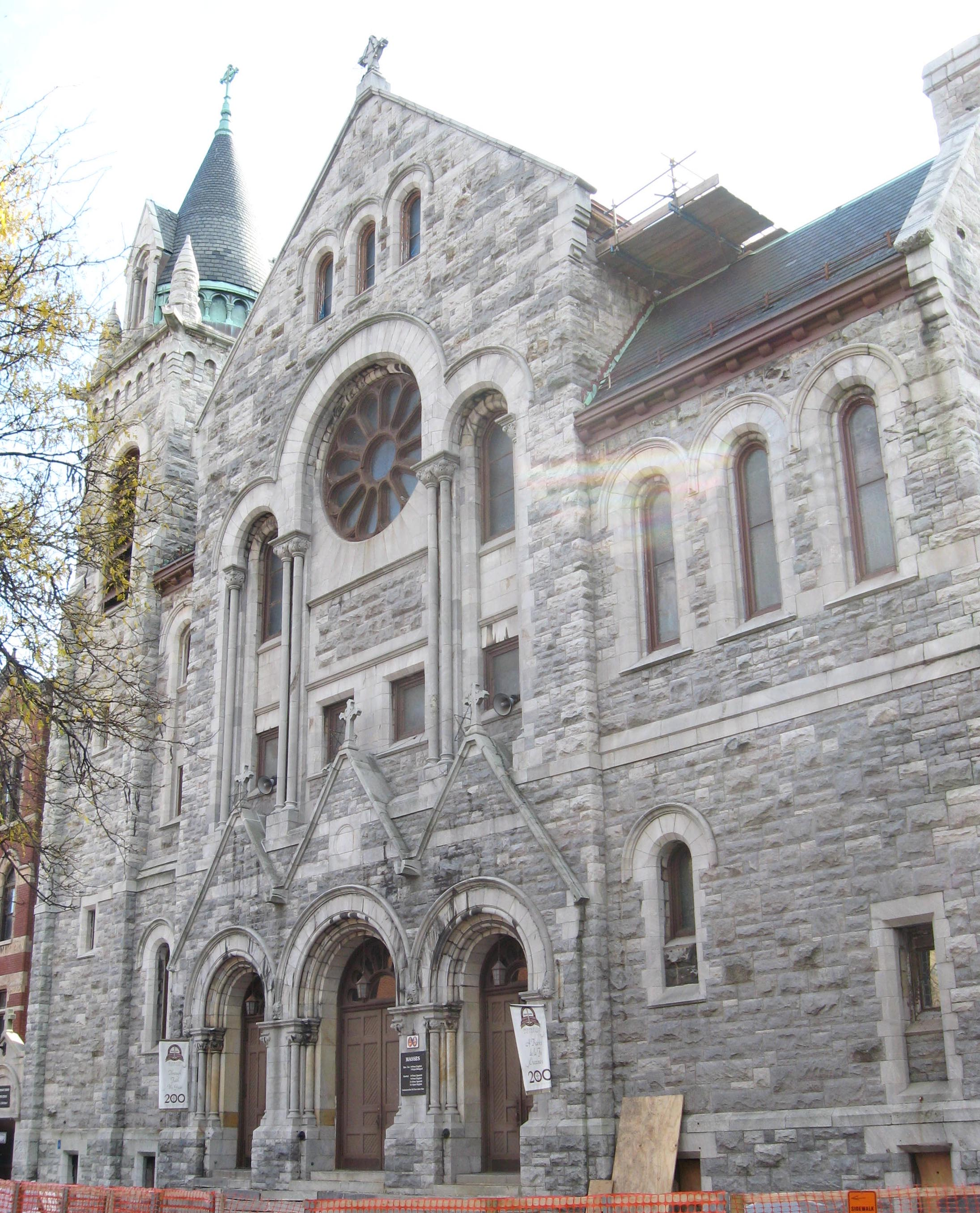
Holy Rosary Church, East Harlem, New York City (2008)

Iriondo was ordained into the priesthood by Bishop Jaime Font y Andreu for the Canons Regular order in San Sebastián, Spain, on December 23, 1962. He then served as professor and master of discipline at a Canons Regular seminary and traveled through Europe on duties related to his religious order. Iriondo also taught at the National Institute, a regional public high school, where served as school secretary as well.

Iriondo came to New York in 1968, accepting an invitation for Spanish priests to serve in the Archdiocese of New York. He then served as chaplain to the Sisters of the Servants of Mary until 1969, when he became parochial vicar at St. Joseph's Parish in Middletown, New York. Iriondo later served as St. Lucy's Parish (1973-1974) and Holy Rosary Parish (1974-1976) in the East Harlem section of Manhattan.

Iriondo was named parochial vicar (1976) and then pastor (1978) of Our Saviour Parish in the Bronx, New York. In 1990, he was appointed director of both the Hispanic Catholic Center and the Charismatic Renewal Movement. Iriondo was incardinated, or transferred, from the Canons Regular Order into the Archdiocese of New York on December 4, 1996, and named vicar for Hispanics in 1997. Iriondo became pastor of St. Anthony of Padua Parish in 2001.

=== Auxiliary Bishop of New York ===
On October 30, 2001, Iriondo was appointed as an auxiliary bishop of New York and titular bishop of Alton by Pope John Paul II. He received his episcopal consecration on December 12, 2001, from Cardinal Edward Egan, with Bishop Henry Mansell and Robert Brucato serving as co-consecrators. He selected as his episcopal motto: "Dominum et Vivificantem"

=== Retirement and legacy ===
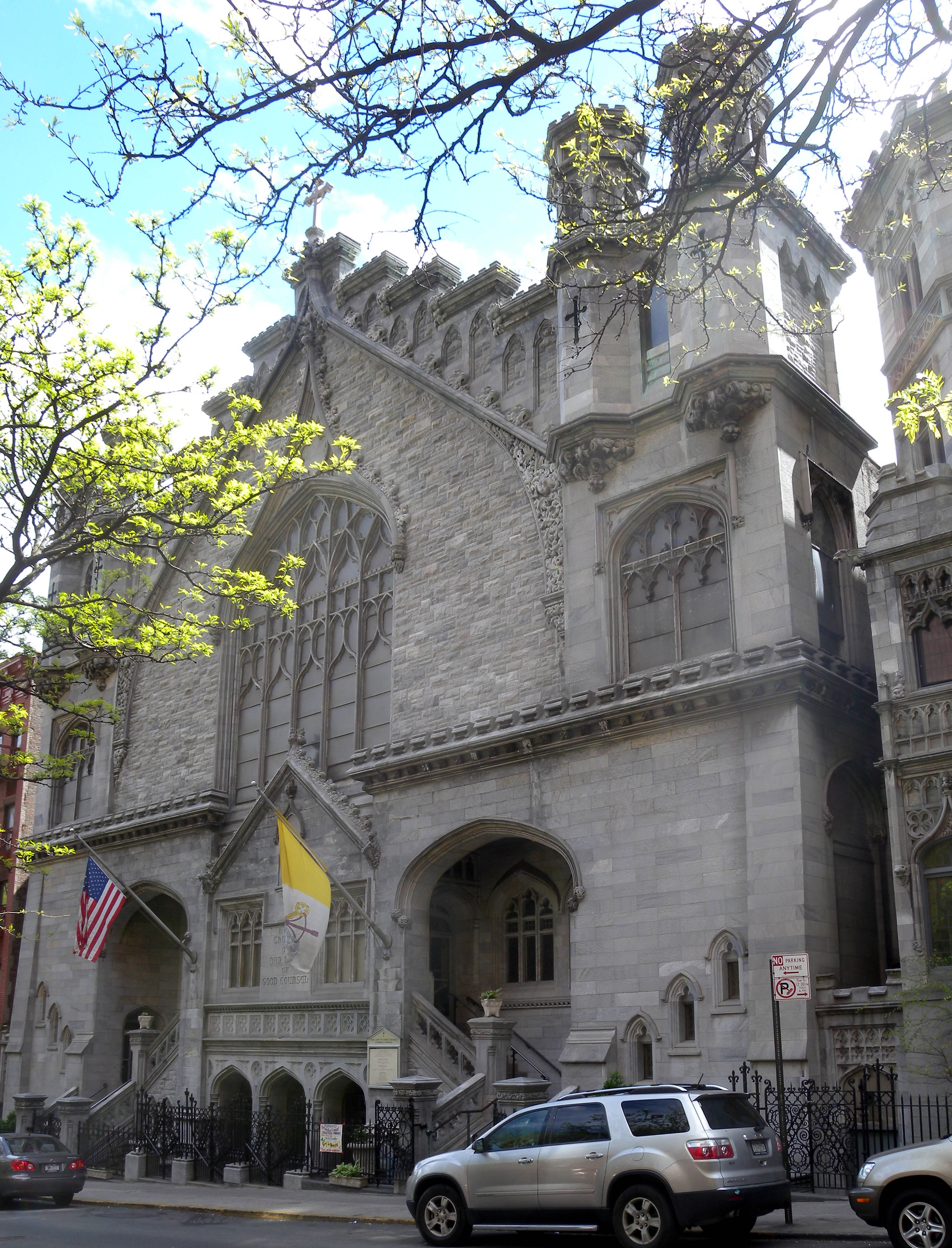
Our Lady of Good Counsel Church, Manhattan (2010)

Iriondo's letter of resignation as auxiliary bishop of New York was accepted by Pope Francis on February 1, 2014.

As of 2025, Iriondo serves as a supply priest for several churches in the Archdiocese, including Our Lady of Good Counsel Church in Manhattan.

== See also ==
- Catholic Church hierarchy
- Catholic Church in the United States
- Historical list of the Catholic bishops of the United States
- List of Catholic bishops of the United States
- Lists of patriarchs, archbishops, and bishops
