= Church of the Blessed Sacrament (Staten Island) =

Roman Catholic church in New York City

Coordinates: 40°37′38.4″N 74°7′33.87″W

The Church of the Blessed Sacrament
- Interactive map of the The Church of the Blessed Sacrament area

General information
- Location: West New Brighton, Staten Island, New York City, United States of America
- Construction started: 1953
- Cost: $175,000
- Client: Roman Catholic Archdiocese of New York

Design and construction
- Architect: Robert J. Reiley of Robert J. Reiley & Associates

The Church of the Blessed Sacrament is a Roman Catholic parish church in the Roman Catholic Archdiocese of New York, located at Forest Avenue at Manor Road, Staten Island, New York City, in the neighborhood of West New Brighton, Staten Island. The parish was established in 1910.

== Buildings ==
The church was built in 1952 to the designs of prolific church building architect Robert J. Reiley of Robert J. Reiley & Associates for $175,000
