= Cathedral College of the Immaculate Conception =

Catholic seminary college in Queens, New York City

Coordinates: 40.747101°N 73.7335978°W

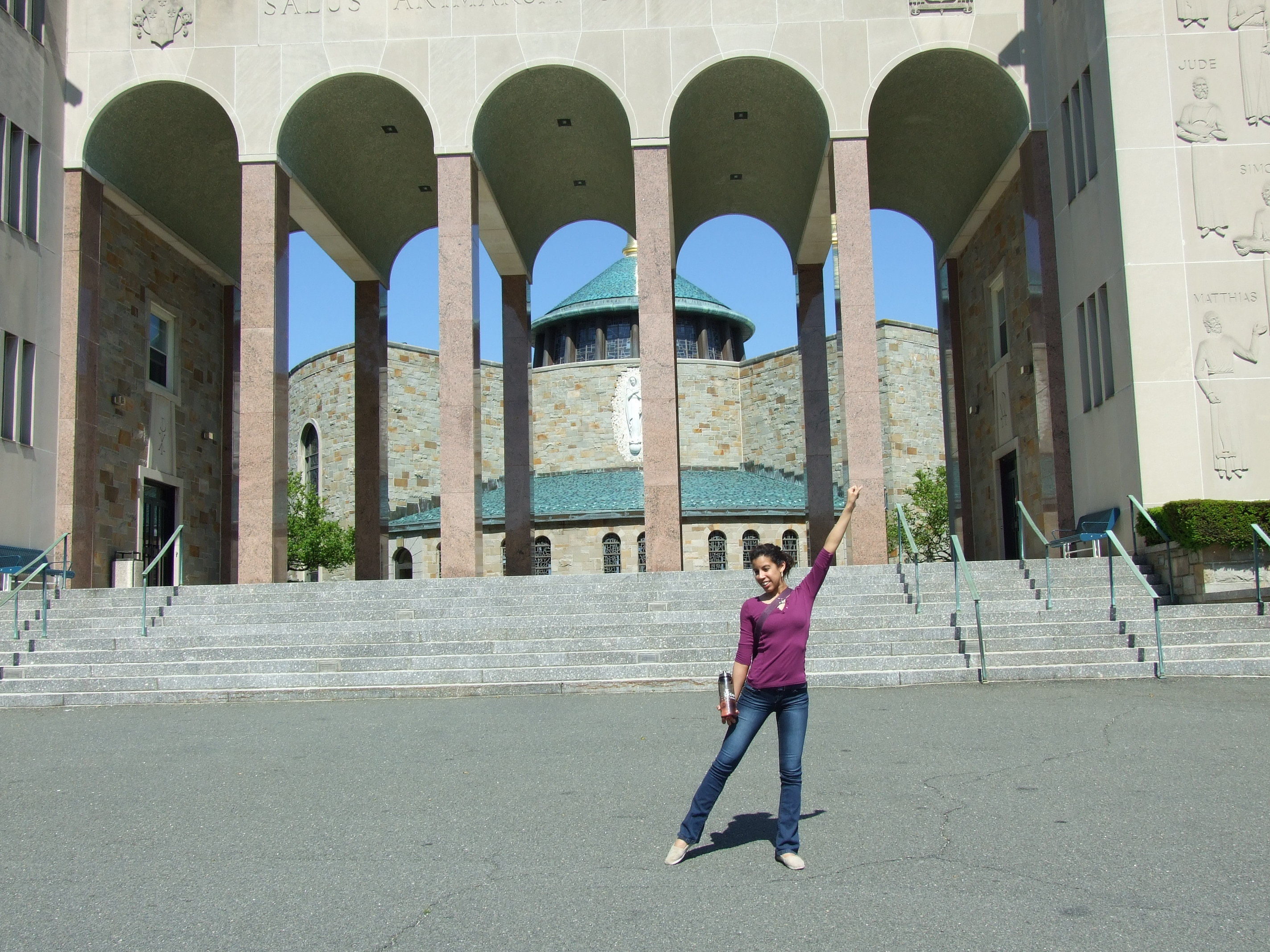
The Cathedral College of the Immaculate Conception in 2012.

Cathedral Seminary House of Formation was a Catholic seminary college in the Douglaston, Queens section of New York City. It was founded in 1914 as a minor seminary for the Diocese of Brooklyn, eventually growing to two New York City campuses in Brooklyn and Queens. In 1967, the college programs were detached from the high school program and relocated to Douglaston as a four-year college.

Cathedral College closed in 1987. Today the Cathedral Seminary House of Formation operates on part of the original college campus. The house of formation shut down its seminary program in 2023, but continues to host graduate level programs for diaconate formation and lay faithful.

== History ==
Cathedral College of the Immaculate Conception was established in 1914 in Brooklyn as a six-year minor seminary. Like other minor seminaries of that time, students would attend a four-year high school track, receiving a high diploma and then complete a two-year college program. Upon completion of the six-year program, students who wanted to continue to the priesthood would enter a major seminary. Other students would continue their last two years of college at another university.

In 1967, Archbishop Bryan J. McEntegart restructured Cathedral College due to shrinking enrollment and fewer students becoming priests. The Brooklyn and Queens campuses became four-year seminary high schools. The college programs were transferred into an independent four-year college seminary in Douglaston, New York. The college was established to serve seminarians from the Diocese of Brooklyn, the Diocese of Rockville Centre on Long Island, and the Archdiocese of New York. The college's inaugural class had 38 students, 22 of whom eventually became priests. By the early 1970s, the college had over 370 students and offered over a dozen college majors.

In October 2022, it was announced that the Dioceses of Brooklyn, Rockville Centre and The Archdiocese of New York would move the majority of its seminary operations to St. Joseph's Seminary in Yonkers, NY, and the minor seminary at Cathedral House of Formation was shut down in 2023. Pre-Theology seminarians were moved to Yonkers and college seminarians will study out of state. The House of Formation will continue to host graduate level theology programs.

The House of Formation will continue to host graduate level theology programs.

== See also ==
- List of defunct colleges and universities in New York

== Sources ==
- Walsh, Kevin (2006). Forgotten New York: views of a lost metropolis. HarperCollins. p. 67. ISBN 978-0-06-114502-5.
