= Robert Anthony Brucato =

American Roman Catholic prelate (1931–2018)

His Excellency, The Most Reverend Robert Anthony Brucato
- Auxiliary Bishop Emeritus of New York; Titular Bishop of Temuniana
- Church: Roman Catholic Church
- Archdiocese: New York
- Appointed: June 30, 1997
- Installed: August 25, 1997
- Term ended: October 31, 2006
- Other post: Titular Bishop of Temuniana

Orders
- Ordination: June 1, 1957 by Francis Spellman
- Consecration: August 25, 1997 by John Joseph O'Connor, Patrick Sheridan, and Henry J. Mansell

Personal details
- Born: August 14, 1931 New York City, US
- Died: November 7, 2018 (aged 87) Yonkers, New York, US
- Motto: My heart is ready, O Lord

Styles of Robert Anthony Brucato
- Reference style: His Excellency; The Most Reverend
- Spoken style: Your Excellency
- Religious style: Bishop

Robert Anthony Brucato (August 14, 1931 – November 7, 2018) was an American prelate of the Roman Catholic Church who served as auxiliary bishop of the Archdiocese of New York from 1997 to 2006.

== Biography ==
=== Early life ===
Robert Brucato was born in the Bronx in New York City on August 14, 1931 to Anthony and Yolanda (nee Vento) Brucato. He attended P.S. 97, a public primary school, and Cardinal Hayes High School, both in the Bronx.

Deciding to become a priest, Brucato entered Cathedral College in Queens, New York City. He completed his preparation for the priesthood at St. Joseph’s Seminary in Yonkers, New York.

=== Priesthood ===
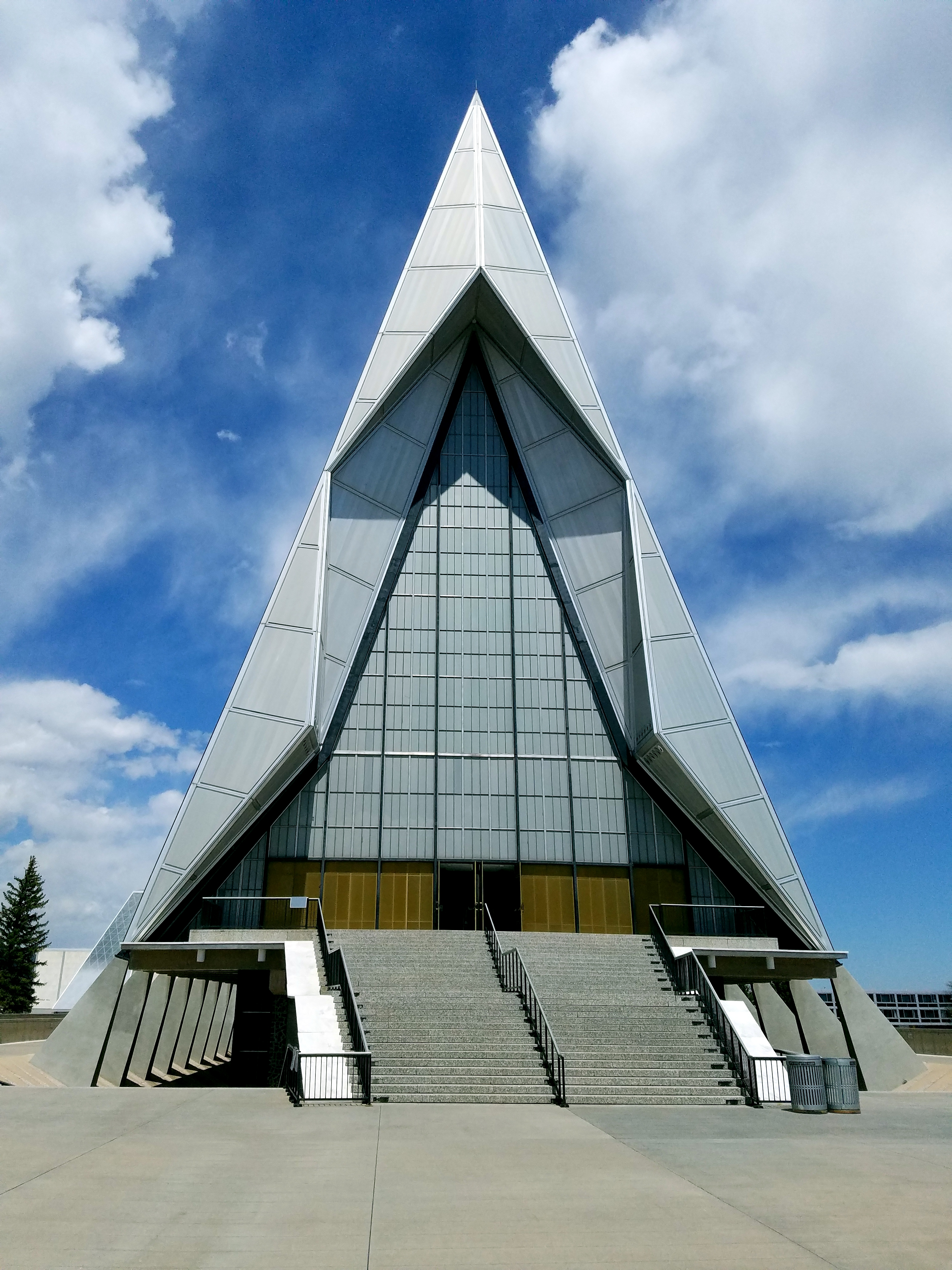
Cadet Chapel, US Air Force Academy, Colorado Springs, Colorado (2018)

Brucato was ordained a priest on June 1, 1957, for the Archdiocese of New York by Cardinal Francis Spellman. During his years with the archdiocese, Brucato served as parochial vicar at the following New York parishes:

- St. Gabriel in the Bronx
- St. Ann in Ossining
- St. Anthony in West Harrison
- St. Charles Borromeo in Dover Plains

In 1960, Spellman made an appeal for priests to become military chaplains for short terms. That same year, Brucato enlisted in the United States Air Force Chaplain Corps. During this period, he obtain a Master of Education degree in psychology and counseling from Our Lady of the Lake College in San Antonio, Texas. He was posted to 22 installations around the world during his time as chaplain. In 1975, in 1975, Brucato sponsored a Vietnamese refugee family to live in his home on Grandview Air Force Base in Kansas City, Missouri.

Brucato also served as director of chaplain services for the Air Forces in Europe and cadet chaplain of the U.S. Air Force Academy in Colorado Springs, Colorado.

In 1982, Brucato retired as a colonel from the Chaplain Corps and returned to New York City. Over the next 14 years, Brucato served as pastor of the following parishes in New York City:

- Holy Rosary in Staten Island (1984 to 1987)
- St. Benedict Parish in the Bronx (1987 to 1994)

Brucato left St. Benedict in 1994 when Cardinal John O’Connor named him as chancellor of the archdiocese.

=== Auxiliary Bishop of New York ===
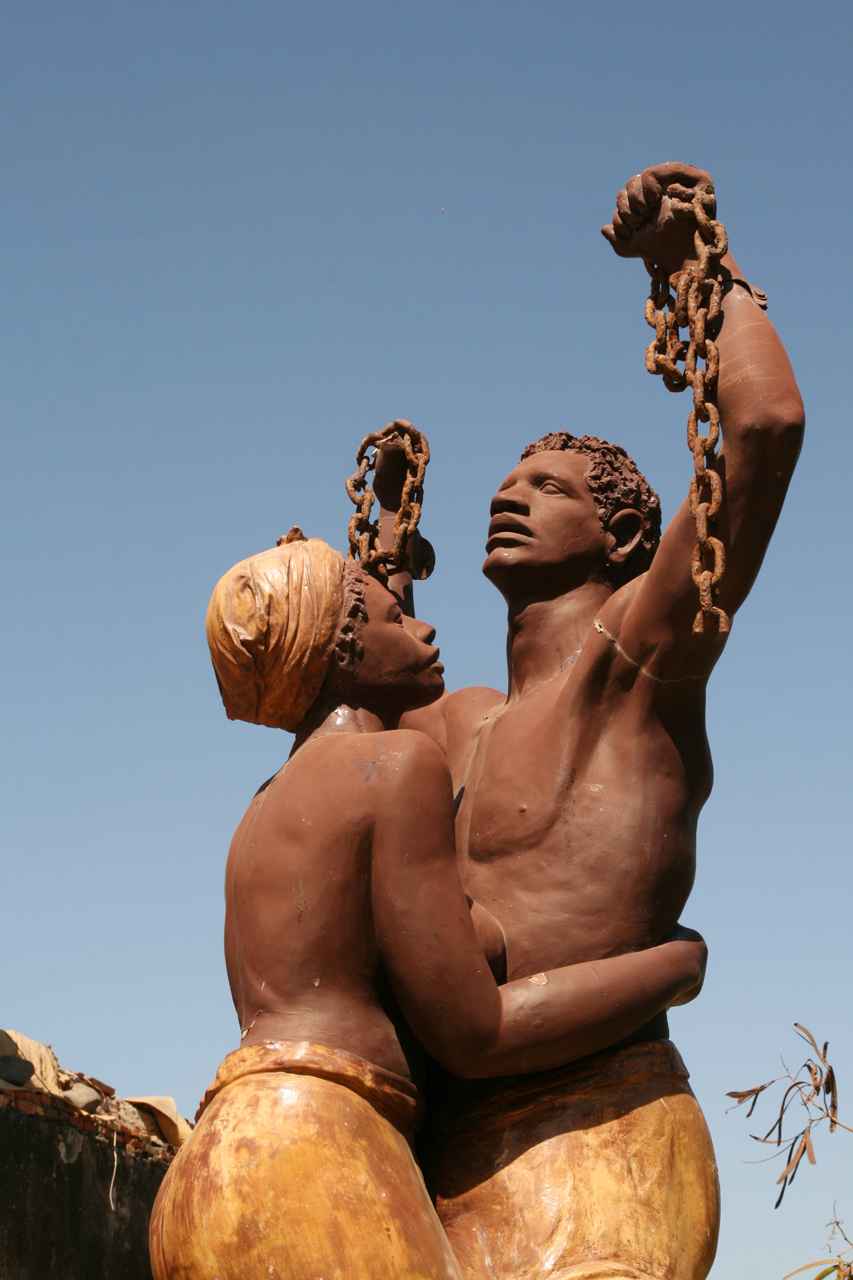
Slavery memorial, Goree Island, Senegal (2010)

Brucato was appointed titular bishop of 'Temuniana' and auxiliary bishop of New York on June 30, 1997 by Pope John Paul II. He was consecrated bishop on August 25, 1997, at St. Patrick's Cathedral in Manhattan by O’Connor. Brucato chose as his episcopal motto "My heart is ready, O Lord".

After his consecration, O'Connor named Brucato as vicar for pastoral guidance. In 1999, he assumed the role of vicar general. In 2001, Brucato also became pastor of St. John the Evangelist Parish in Manhattan.

In 2003, Brucato traveled to Goree, an island in Senegal that was a center of the trans-Atlantic slave trade. He was part of a US delegation participating in a service of reconciliation and forgiveness.

=== Death and legacy ===
On October 31, 2006, Brucato retired as auxiliary bishop of New York at age 75. He later moved into the St. John Vianney Priests Residence in the Bronx. Brucato died on November 7, 2018, in Yonkers, New York.

== See also ==
- Catholic Church hierarchy
- Catholic Church in the United States
- Historical list of the Catholic bishops of the United States
- List of Catholic bishops of the United States
- Lists of patriarchs, archbishops, and bishops

Catholic Church titles
Preceded by –	Auxiliary Bishop of New York; 1997–2006	Succeeded by –
