= Edward Egan =

American Catholic cardinal (1932–2015)

His Eminence Edward Michael Egan
- Cardinal Archbishop of New York
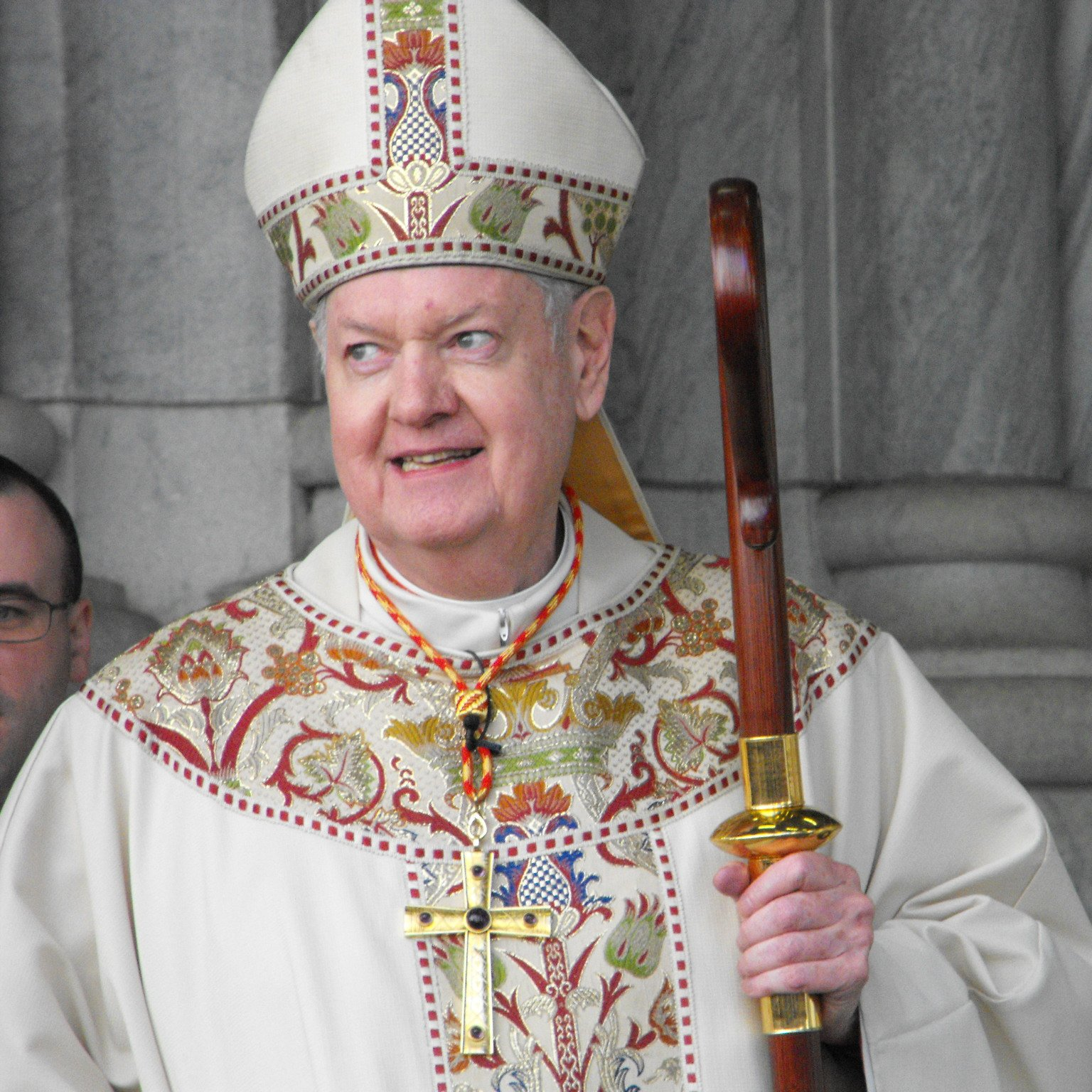
- Egan in 2009
- Diocese: Archdiocese of New York
- Appointed: May 11, 2000
- Installed: June 19, 2000
- Term ended: February 23, 2009
- Predecessor: John Joseph O'Connor
- Successor: Timothy M. Dolan
- Other post: Cardinal-Priest of Ss. Giovanni e Paolo
- Previous posts: Bishop of Bridgeport (1988–2000); Auxiliary Bishop of New York (1985–1988)

Orders
- Ordination: December 15, 1957 by Martin John O'Connor
- Consecration: May 22, 1985 by Bernardin Gantin
- Created cardinal: February 21, 2001 by John Paul II
- Rank: Cardinal-Priest

Personal details
- Born: Edward Michael Egan; April 2, 1932 Oak Park, Illinois, U.S.
- Died: March 5, 2015 (aged 82) Manhattan, New York City, U.S.
- Buried: St. Patrick's Cathedral, New York, New York, U.S.
- Denomination: Catholic
- Parents: Thomas J. and Genevieve Costello Egan
- Motto: In the holiness of truth

Ordination history of Edward Egan
History
Episcopal consecration
- Consecrated by: Bernardin Gantin (Pref. Cong. Epis.)
- Date: May 22, 1985
Episcopal succession
Bishops consecrated by Edward Egan as principal consecrator
- Josu Iriondo: December 12, 2001
- Timothy Anthony McDonnell: December 12, 2001
- Dominick John Lagonegro: December 12, 2001
- Robert Joseph Cunningham: May 18, 2004
- Gerald Thomas Walsh: September 21, 2004
- Dennis Joseph Sullivan: September 21, 2004
- Charles Daniel Balvo: June 29, 2005
- Robert E. Guglielmone: March 25, 2009

Styles of Edward Egan
- Reference style: His Eminence
- Spoken style: Your Eminence
- Informal style: Cardinal
- See: New York (emeritus)

Edward Michael Egan (April 2, 1932 – March 5, 2015) was an American Catholic prelate who served as bishop of Bridgeport in Connecticut from 1988 to 2000 and as archbishop of New York from 2000 to 2009. He was elevated to the cardinalate in 2001.

== Early life and education ==
The third of four children, Edward Egan was born on April 2, 1932, in Oak Park, Illinois, the son of Thomas J. and Genevieve (née Costello) Egan. His father was a sales manager and his mother was a homemaker and former teacher; his parents' families were from County Mayo and County Clare, Ireland. In 1943, Egan and his older brother contracted polio, causing them to miss two years of school while convalescing at home.

Egan attended Archbishop Quigley Preparatory Seminary in Chicago, Illinois, where he was elected student body president and editor of the student newspaper and yearbook. After graduating from high school in 1951, he entered St. Mary of the Lake Seminary in Mundelein, Illinois, obtaining a Bachelor of Arts degree in philosophy. Egan was then sent to the Pontifical North American College in Rome, taking his academic courses in theology at the Pontifical Gregorian University.

== Priesthood ==
Egan was ordained to the priesthood at the Basilica of Santi Giovanni e Paolo al Celio in Rome by Archbishop Martin O'Connor on December 15, 1957, for the Archdiocese of Chicago.

Egan was awarded a Licentiate of Sacred Theology from the Gregorian University in 1958. After returning to Chicago, the archdiocese assigned Egan as associate pastor of Holy Name Cathedral Parish, assistant chancellor for the archdiocese, and priest-secretary to Cardinal Albert Meyer. During this time, Egan also taught evening classes for potential Catholic converts and served as a chaplain at Wesley Memorial Hospital in Chicago.

In 1960, Egan returned to the Gregorian University in Rome to pursue his doctorate. During his studies, he became assistant vice-rector and repetitor of moral theology and canon law at the North American College. Egan received his doctorate in canon law summa cum laude in 1964. Back in Chicago, Egan was appointed priest-secretary to Cardinal John Cody. As his secretary, he "saw Cardinal Cody take the heat for good causes" such as the American civil rights movement and racial desegregation.

Egan was later appointed secretary of the archdiocesan Commissions on Ecumenism and Human Relations, sitting on several interfaith organizations and establishing dialogue with Jews and Protestants. From 1969 to 1971, he served as co-chancellor for the archdiocese. Egan returned to Rome in 1971 when Pope Paul VI named him an auditor of the Sacred Roman Rota.

While serving on the Roman Rota, Egan also served as a professor of canon law at the Gregorian University and of civil and criminal procedure at the Studio Rotale. Egan served as a commissioner of the Congregation for the Sacraments and Divine Worship and a consultor of the Congregation for the Clergy as well. In 1982, Egan was chosen to be one of the six canonists who reviewed the new Code of Canon Law with Pope John Paul II before its promulgation in 1983.

== Episcopal career ==
On April 1, 1985, John Paul II appointed Egan as an auxiliary bishop of New York and titular bishop of Allegheny. He received his episcopal consecration at the Basilica of Saints John and Paul on May 22, 1985, by Cardinal Bernardin Gantin, with Archbishop John O'Connor and Bishop John Keating serving as co-consecrators. He selected as his episcopal motto: "In the Holiness of the Truth" Ephesians 4:24. As an auxiliary bishop, Egan served as vicar for education.

=== Bishop of Bridgeport ===
On November 5, 1988, John Paul II appointed Egan as the third bishop of Bridgeport. He was installed on December 14, 1988.

During his tenure, Egan oversaw the reorganization of Catholic schools. He also raised $45 million for diocesan schools through a fundraising campaign, "Faith in the Future." The diocesan Catholic Charities under his tenure became the largest private social service agency in Fairfield County, Connecticut. To support the 12 Hispanic parishes in the diocese, he brought Spanish-speaking priests to Bridgeport from Colombia. Egan also established a home for retired priests and a school for children with special needs.

Within the United States Conference of Catholic Bishops (USCCB), Egan served as chair of the board of governors of the Pontifical North American College and of the Committee on Science and Human Values. He was also a member of the Committee on Canonical Affairs, the Committee on Education, the Committee on National Collections, and the Committee on Nominations, and served two terms on the USCCB administrative board.

=== Archbishop of New York ===
John Paul II appointed Egan as archbishop of New York on May 11, 2000, a week after Archbishop O'Connor's death. Egan was installed on June 19, 2000, with soprano Renée Fleming performing at the ceremony.

On becoming archbishop, Egan prioritized the encouragement of vocations to the priesthood. Besides private initiatives, each year on the Feast of St. Joseph (March 19th), he offered a mass for prospective high school and college men. Egan appointed two priests as vocation directors to aid him in promoting the priesthood, although they were unable to reverse the declining trend.

Egan was elevated to the cardinalate by John Paul II at the consistory of February 21, 2001, becoming the cardinal-priest of the Basilica of Ss. Ioannis et Pauli in Rome As cardinal, one of Egan's main concerns was the archdiocesan seminary in Yonkers, New York. In March 2001, he announced the restructuring of the seminary faculty. A Staten Island pastor, Reverend Peter Finn, was chosen as seminary rector. The minor seminary, then located in Riverdale, Bronx, was moved to the campus of the major seminary.

Egan was a prominent influence in New York City after the September 11, 2001, attacks at the World Trade Center in Manhattan. According to an article in Catholic New York:

"The cardinal responded to the disaster – ministering to the injured and anointing the dead at St. Vincent's Hospital and at Ground Zero itself. He planned a center for victims' families at the New School and an interfaith service at Yankee Stadium. Egan also offered masses at St. Patrick's Cathedral in the immediate aftermath of the attacks and funerals there and around the archdiocese for months."

In 2002, the Institución del Mérito Humanitario in Barcelona, Spain, awarded Egan the "Gran Cruz al Mérito Humanitario". Also in 2002, John Paul II named Egan to the Supreme Tribunal of the Apostolic Signature, the church's highest court of canon law. For retired priests, Egan established the John Cardinal O'Connor residence in 2003 at the previous site of the minor seminary in Riverdale.

In 2003, Egan was accused of concealing the names of priests who had been accused of child molestation, but found not guilty by the church. His spokesman argued that the innocent should be protected, while groups such as Voice of the Faithful criticized the process as being out of the public view. Egan participated in the 2005 papal conclave in Rome that selected Pope Benedict XVI. In 2006, Egan began hosting a weekly program on The Catholic Channel of Sirius Satellite Radio. He discussed events in the archdiocese and issues in the church. The channel also broadcast his Sunday mass from the cathedral.

Egan in January 2007 announced the closure of ten under-utilized parishes and the merger of 11 other parishes. He stated that this was, "based on the migration of Catholics in the inner-city to the outer boroughs". He also announced the establishment of five new parishes; three in Orange County. New York, one in Staten Island and one in Dutchess County, New York. Building projects were also approved for nine parishes. The closures caused some discontent among the affected parishes.

On December 15, 2007, Egan celebrated his 50th anniversary as a priest. Pope Benedict XVI appointed him to the Congregation for the Oriental Churches on January 26, 2008. Egan then hosted the papal visit to New York during April 2008, marking the 200th anniversary of the diocese. In 2009, Egan publicly condemned controversial statements made by Richard Williamson, an excommunicated Catholic bishop, about the reality of the Holocaust.

== Resignation and final years ==
On April 2, 2007, Egan offered his letter of resignation as archbishop of New York to Pope Benedict XVI, having reached the mandatory retirement age of 75. Egan was the first archbishop of New York to retire; all previous archbishops had died in office. Egan's resignation became official on February 23, 2009, when Benedict XVI appointed Archbishop Timothy Dolan as his successor. Dolan took possession of the archdiocese on April 15, 2009.

Egan served as a member of the board of trustees at the Catholic University of America in Washington, D.C., and a founding member of the board of governors at Ave Maria School of Law in Naples, Florida. When Egan reached age 80 in 2012, he ceased to be cardinal-elector.

Egan was admitted to St. Vincent's Hospital in Manhattan on April 4, 2009, experiencing stomach pains. He was released on April 7th, and later implanted with a pacemaker. Egan was well enough to preside over major liturgical services for the April 9th to 12th Easter Triduum, days before the arrival of his successor.

== Death and legacy ==
Egan died on March 5, 2015, at the NYU Langone Medical Center in Manhattan of cardiac arrest. His death was announced by Dolan. Many bishops released statements mourning Egan. From March 9th to March 10th, his body lay in state at St. Patrick's Cathedral in Manhattan. It was flanked by an honor guard of members of the New York City Police Department, the Fire Department of New York, the Knights of Columbus, the Knights and Ladies of Malta and the Knights and Ladies of the Holy Sepulchre.

Dolan on March 10th celebrated a requiem mass for Egan at St. Patrick's Cathedral. The mass was attended by bishops from around the United States, including Cardinals William Levada, Justin Rigali, Sean O'Malley, Roger Mahony, Daniel Dinardo and McCarrick. The apostolic nuncio to the United States, Carlo Maria Viganò, read a letter from Pope Francis. The mass was also attended by New York Mayor Bill de Blasio and former mayors Michael Bloomberg, Rudy Giuliani and David Dinkins, along with Governor Andrew Cuomo. After the mass, Egan was interred in the crypt of the cathedral beneath the high altar.

== Viewpoints ==
=== Abortion ===
In an article published next to a photo of a fetus in the womb, Egan compared tolerating abortions to the reasoning used by Adolf Hitler and Joseph Stalin to commit mass murders. Egan believed that Catholic politicians who support abortion rights for women should be forbidden communion on grounds of public scandal. In April 2008, after newspapers published photographs of Giuliani receiving communion at a mass in St. Patrick's Cathedral offered by Benedict XVI, Egan issued a public statement:

The Catholic Church clearly teaches that abortion is a grave offense against the will of God. Throughout my years as Archbishop of New York, I have repeated this teaching in sermons, articles, addresses, and interviews without hesitation or compromise of any kind. Thus it was that I had an understanding with Mr. Rudolph Giuliani, when I became Archbishop of New York and he was serving as Mayor of New York, that he was not to receive the Eucharist because of his well-known support of abortion. I deeply regret that Mr. Giuliani received the Eucharist during the Papal visit here in New York, and I will be seeking a meeting with him to insist that he abide by our understanding.

=== Clerical celibacy ===
In a radio interview in March 2009, Egan stated that clerical celibacy in the Latin Church could be open to discussion. He added, "I think it has to be looked at, and I'm not so sure it wouldn't be a good idea to decide on the basis of geography and culture—not to make an across-the-board determination." He further noted that Eastern Catholic married men were allowed to be priests with "no problem at all."

Egan later moderated his statement, saying, "Celibacy is one of the Church's greatest blessings. I will have to be more careful about trying to explain a somewhat complicated matter in 90 seconds."

=== Same sex marriage ===
Egan assailed the notion of same-sex marriage and criticized Hollywood for "desecrating" marriage and destroying "something sacred and holy." Egan said the specter of legal same-sex marriage would have a devastating effect on traditional values already eroded by a crude pop culture, the New York Daily News reported.

== Sexual abuses in Bridgeport ==
In April 2002, in a letter read out at mass, Egan apologized saying for the sexual abuse scandal in Bridgeport.

"If in hindsight we also discover that mistakes may have been made as regards prompt removal of priests and assistance to victims, I am deeply sorry."

The Connecticut Supreme Court ruled in 2009 that the Diocese of Bridgeport release records detailing allegations of sexual abuse by priests in the diocese. The ruling covered over 12,600 pages of documents from 23 lawsuits against six priests that have been under seal since the diocese settled the cases in 2001.

Egan in 2012 retracted his 2002 apology for sexual abuse crimes in Bridgeport. In an interview with Connecticut Magazine, he said: "I never should have said that," and "I don't think we did anything wrong." He repeatedly denied that any sexual abuse happened while he was leading the dioceseIn 2018, Reverend Boniface Ramsey said that he once tried to speak with Egan concerning McCarrick's sexual activities, but Egan "didn't want to hear it." McCarrick maintained his innocence, but the Vatican found him guilty of sexual abuse crimes and laicized him in 2019.

In October 2019, former Connecticut Superior Court Judge Robert Holzberg released the results of his investigation, commissioned by Bishop Frank Caggiano, into the diocese's handling of accusations of sexual abuse by its priests. Holzberg found that all three of Bridgeport's bishops over 40 years had consistently failed to fulfill their moral and legal responsibilities.

Holzberg found that Egan took a "dismissive, uncaring, and at times threatening attitude toward survivors"; he characterized Egan's behavior as "profoundly unsympathetic, inadequate, and inflammatory". Holzberg said that Egan broke a 1971 Connecticut State law by failing to report abuse allegations and that he deliberately concealed the reasons for transferring abusive priests. Among other findings, in a July 12, 1993, letter to diocesan counsel Renato Ottaviani, explaining his refusal to seek the involuntary laicization of serial abuser Reverend Raymond Pcolka, Egan wrote:

"... it is obvious that there can be no canonical process either for the removal of a diocesan priest from his priestly duties or for the removal of a priest from his parish when there is serious reason to believe that the priest in question is guilty of the sexual violation of children, and especially when he has confessed such a violation to the bishop or a delegate of the bishop. For the bishop who would countenance such a process would be opening the way to the gravest of evils, among them the financial ruin of the diocese which he is to serve."

Catholic Church titles
Preceded by George L. Leech	Titular Bishop of Allegheny; 1985–1988	Succeeded by Patrick J. McGrath
Preceded by Walter William Curtis	Bishop of Bridgeport; 1988–2000	Succeeded by William E. Lori
Preceded by John Joseph O'Connor	Archbishop of New York; 2000–2009	Succeeded by Timothy Michael Dolan
Preceded by John Joseph O'Connor	Cardinal-Priest of Santi Giovanni e Paolo; 2001–2015	Succeeded by Jozef De Kesel
