= Gerald Thomas Walsh =

American Roman Catholic bishop (1942–2025)

His Excellency, The Most Reverend Gerald Thomas Walsh
- Auxiliary Bishop Emeritus of New York; Titular Bishop of Altiburus
- Church: Roman Catholic Church
- Archdiocese: New York
- Appointed: June 28, 2004
- Installed: September 21, 2004
- Retired: September 5, 2017
- Predecessor: Karl Flugel
- Other post: Titular Bishop of Altiburus (2004–2025)

Orders
- Ordination: May 27, 1967 by Francis Spellman
- Consecration: September 21, 2004 by Edward Egan, Robert Anthony Brucato, and Patrick Sheridan

Personal details
- Born: April 25, 1942 New York City, U.S.
- Died: May 4, 2025 (aged 83)
- Motto: That all may be one

Styles of Gerald Thomas Walsh
- Reference style: His Excellency; The Most Reverend
- Spoken style: Your Excellency
- Religious style: Bishop

Gerald Thomas Walsh (April 25, 1942 – May 4, 2025) was an American Catholic prelate who served as an auxiliary bishop for the Archdiocese of New York from 2004 to 2017.

While bishop, Walsh also served as rector of St. Joseph's Seminary in Yonkers, New York, from 2007 to 2013.

== Biography ==
=== Early life ===
Gerald Walsh was born on April 25, 1942, in Manhattan, the eldest of the three children of Thomas Walsh, a police officer, and Anne (née Haggerty) Walsh, a homemaker. His siblings are Michael (b. 1944) and Monica (b. 1950). Gerald Walsh attended Good Shepherd School and Power Memorial Academy in New York City, then Iona College in New Rochelle, New York in 1959; there he earned the nickname of "St. Gerry" from his classmates. Walsh then attended St. Joseph's Seminary, where he obtained his bachelor's degree and his Master of Divinity degree.

=== Priesthood ===
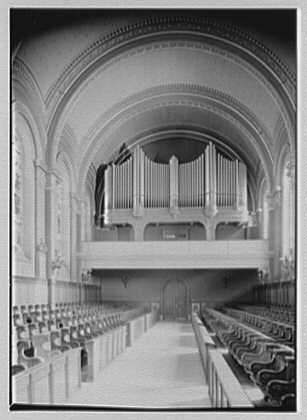
St. Joseph's Seminary, Yonkers, New York

Walsh was ordained to the priesthood for the Archdiocese of New York by Cardinal Francis Spellman on May 27, 1967, in St. Patrick's Cathedral in Manhattan. Walsh then studied Spanish at the Institute for Intercultural Communication of the Pontifical Catholic University of Puerto Rico in Ponce, Puerto Rico.

After returning to New York, Walsh served as parochial vicar of Holy Trinity Parish in Manhattan until 1980. He received his Master of Social Work degree from Fordham University in New York City in 1983. Also in 1980, Walsh was appointed head of the Department of Family and Children's Services at Catholic Charities, holding that position until 1989. He was raised by the Vatican to the rank of monsignor in 1990. For the next six years, he was pastor of Incarnation Parish in Washington Heights, Manhattan.

From January 1996 to August 1998, Walsh served as private secretary to Cardinal John O'Connor. During this time, he accompanied O'Connor on ten trips to Rome, where he met Pope John Paul II. Walsh later reflected on this period, saying, "I learned a lot of things I would not have known otherwise, how to handle certain situations". Walsh was then named pastor of St. Elizabeth's Parish in Washington Heights, and regional vicar of North Manhattan in September of that same year. In 2003, Walsh was named vicar of development of the archdiocese, serving as its chief fundraiser.

=== Auxiliary Bishop of New York ===
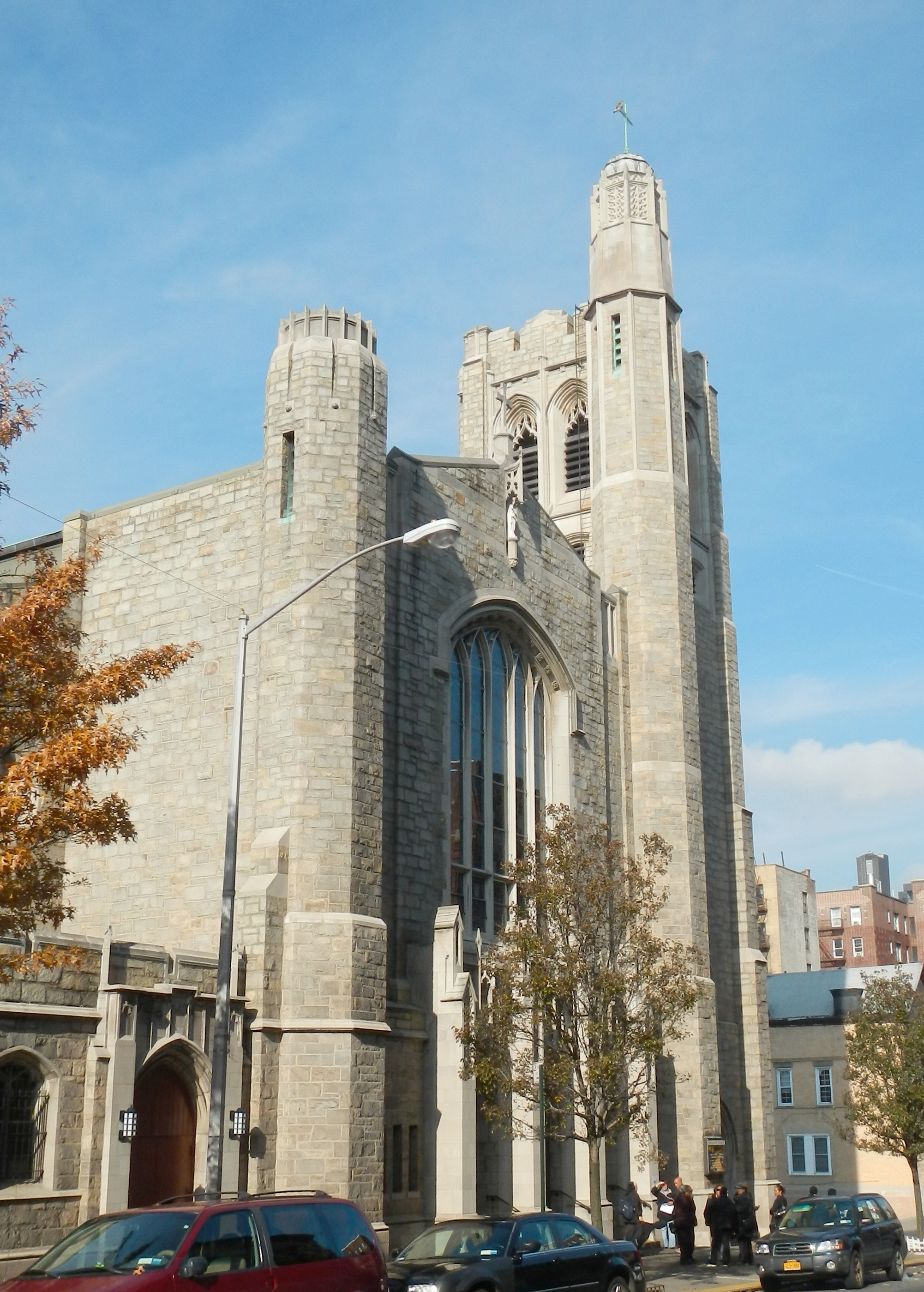
St. Elizabeth's Church, Manhattan, New York City (2012)

On June 28, 2004, Walsh was appointed an auxiliary bishop of New York and Titular Bishop of Altiburus by John Paul II. He received his episcopal consecration on September 21, 2004, from Cardinal Edward Egan, with Bishops Robert Brucato and Patrick Sheridan serving as co-consecrators. Walsh chose as his episcopal motto: "That All May Be One" (John 17:21). He explained his motto as a call to "unite around the teacher," for "the role of a bishop is to be a teacher, one who teaches primarily by example".

In 2007, Walsh was also named rector of St. Joseph's Seminary. He became the only bishop to serve as the head of an American seminary.

Walsh also served as associate chaplain of the Knights of Columbus' New York Chapter since 1980, and was a member of the archdiocesan priests' council and college of consultors starting in 2000. On February 13, 2013, Walsh was named vicar general of the archdiocese, holding that position until 2014.

=== Retirement and death ===
On September 5, 2017, Pope Francis accepted Walsh's letter of resignation as auxiliary bishop of New York after he reached the mandatory retirement age of 75.

Walsh enjoyed playing handball, at least until sustaining a knee injury, and taking walks in the community. Walsh died on May 4, 2025, at the age of 83.

== See also ==
- Catholic Church hierarchy
- Catholic Church in the United States
- Historical list of the Catholic bishops of the United States
- List of Catholic bishops of the United States
- Lists of patriarchs, archbishops, and bishops

== Episcopal succession ==
Catholic Church titles
Preceded by –	Auxiliary Bishop of New York; 2004–2017	Succeeded by –
Preceded by Karl Borromäus Flügel	Titular Bishop of Altiburus; 2004–2025	Succeeded by Vacant
