= Archdiocese of New York =

Latin Catholic diocese in New York, US

Archdiocese of New York Archidiœcesis Neo-Eboracensis

Catholic
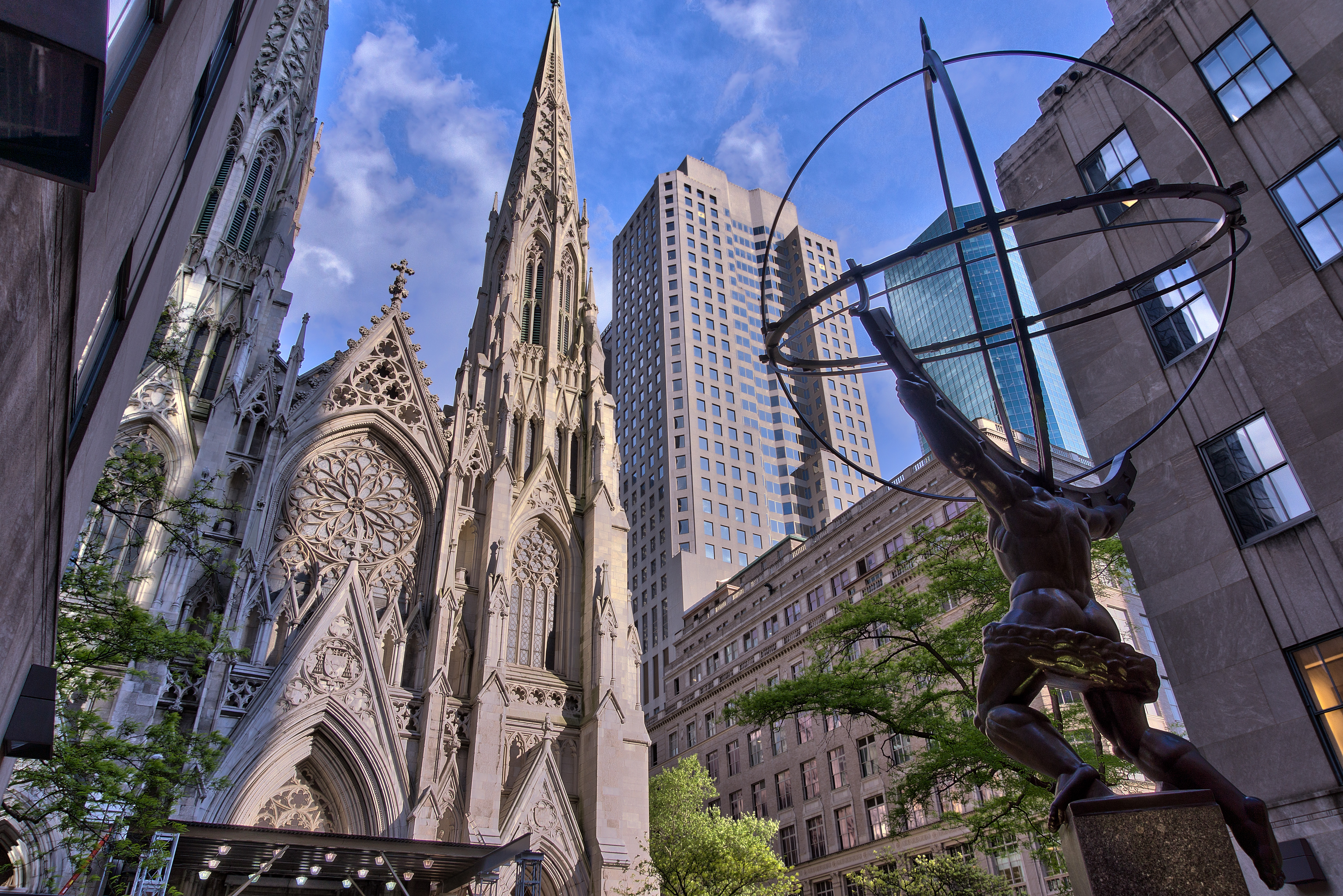
- St. Patrick's Cathedral in Midtown Manhattan

- Coat of arms

Location
- Country: United States
- Territory: New York City (Bronx, Manhattan, Staten Island), counties of Dutchess, Orange, Putnam, Rockland, Sullivan, Ulster, and Westchester, New York
- Episcopal conference: USCCB
- Ecclesiastical region: Bishops' Region II
- Ecclesiastical province: New York
- Coordinates: 40°45′27″N 73°57′50″W

Statistics
- Area: 12,212 km^{2} (4,715 sq mi)
- Population: Total; Catholics: (as of 2019); 6,238,441; 2,807,298 (45%)
- Parishes: 288

Information
- Denomination: Catholic Church
- Sui iuris church: Latin Church
- Rite: Roman Rite
- Established: April 8, 1808; 218 years ago, as Diocese of New York; July 19, 1850; 176 years ago, as Archdiocese of New York
- Cathedral: St. Patrick's Cathedral
- Patron saint: Patrick
- Secular priests: 320

Current leadership
- Pope: Leo XIV
- Archbishop: Ronald Hicks
- Auxiliary Bishops: Gerardo Joseph Colacicco; Edmund Whalen; Joseph A. Espaillat
- Vicar General: Edmund Whalen
- Judicial Vicar: Brian Taylor
- Bishops emeritus: Peter John Byrne; James Francis McCarthy; Timothy Dolan; Josu Iriondo; Dominick John Lagonegro; John Joseph Jenik; John Joseph O'Hara

Map
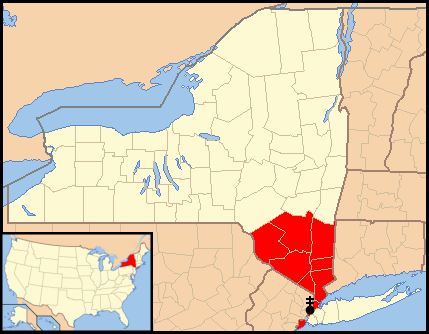

Website
- archny.org

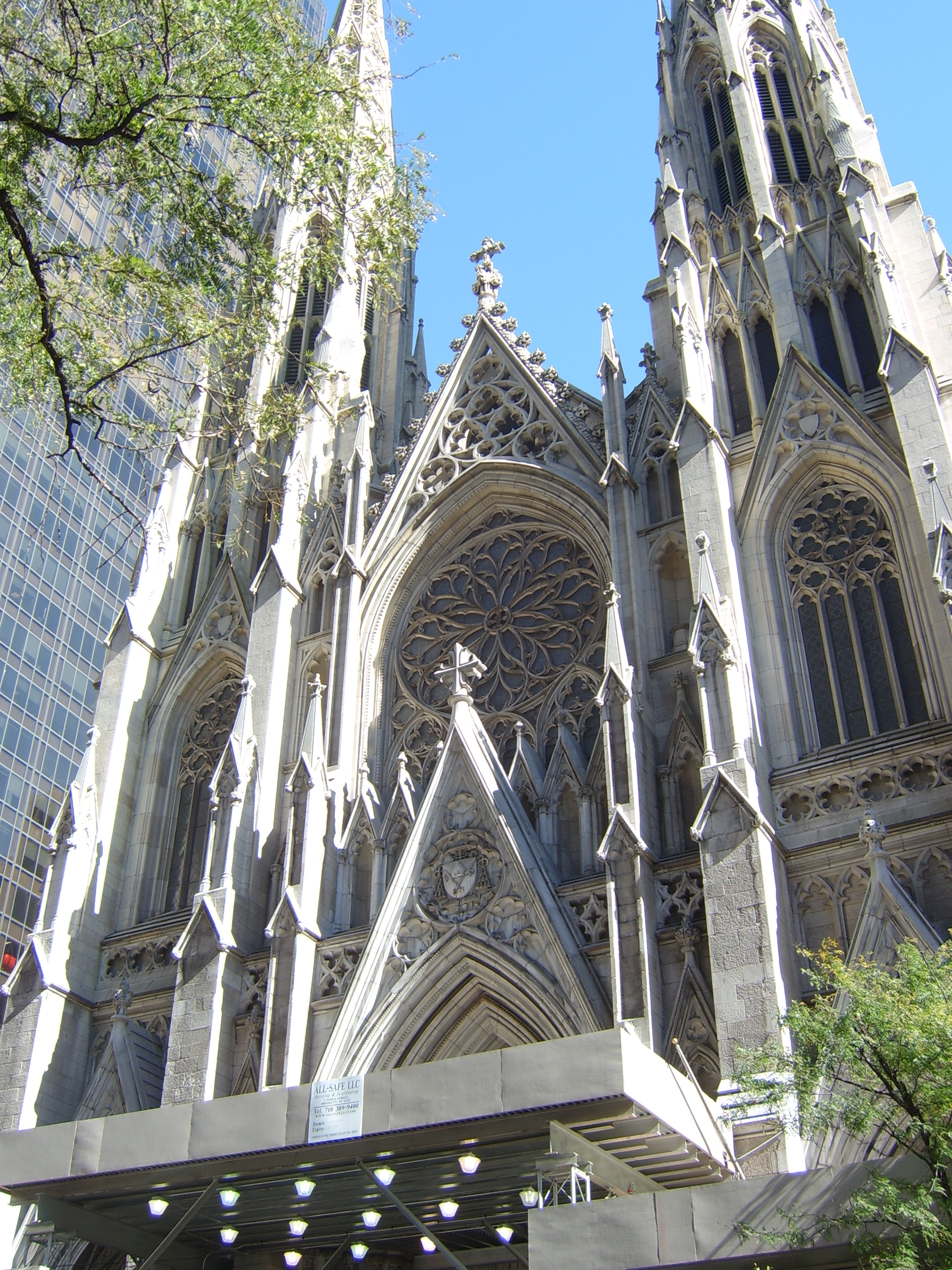
Current St. Patrick's Cathedral in Manhattan (2008)

The Archdiocese of New York (Latin: Archidiœcesis Neo-Eboracensis) is an archdiocese of the Latin Church of the Catholic Church located in the State of New York. It encompasses the boroughs of Manhattan, the Bronx and Staten Island in New York City and the counties of Dutchess, Orange, Putnam, Rockland, Sullivan, Ulster, and Westchester to the north of the city. It does not include the New York City boroughs of Brooklyn or Queens, which form the Diocese of Brooklyn nor north of the Hudson Valley; however, the Diocese of Brooklyn is a suffragan diocese in the ecclesiastical province of which the Archdiocese of New York is the metropolitan see.

The Archdiocese of New York is the second-largest diocese in the United States by population, encompassing 296 parishes that serve around 2.8 million Catholics, in addition to hundreds of Catholic schools, hospitals and charities. The archdiocese also operates St. Joseph's Seminary in Yonkers, New York. The archbishop is also the metropolitan of the larger Ecclesiastical Province of New York.

The Good Newsroom is the digital news outlet of the archdiocese and includes a website, social media channels, an app, and a weekly e-newsletter.

R. Luke Concanen was appointed the first bishop of what was then the Diocese of New York in 1808. On December 18, 2025, Pope Leo XIV named Bishop Ronald Hicks of Joliet, Illinois, to succeed the retiring archbishop, Cardinal Timothy Dolan. Since 1911 every archbishop of the archdiocese has been elevated to the College of Cardinals, although such elevation is often deferred for a number of years.

== Prelature ==
The ordinary of the Archdiocese of New York is an archbishop whose cathedral is the Cathedral of St. Patrick in Manhattan, New York. The archdiocese is the metropolitan see of the ecclesiastical province of New York, which includes the following suffragan dioceses:

- Albany
- Brooklyn
- Buffalo
- Ogdensburg
- Rochester
- Rockville Centre
- Syracuse

The ecclesiastical province includes all of New York State, except for Fishers Island which is part of the Province of Hartford.

As in any province, the metropolitan archbishop possesses certain limited authority over the suffragan sees. (see Ecclesiastical Province § Catholic Church).

== History ==
=== 1784 to 1808 ===
On November 26, 1784, Pope Pius VI erected the Apostolic Prefecture of the United States, creating a separate jurisdiction for the new United States from the Catholic Church of the United Kingdom. That same year, the new State of New York repealed the colonial-era law prohibiting Catholic priests from residing in New York.

With the anti-priest law repealed, the French consul, Hector St. John de Crevecoeur, organized a group of laymen in 1785 to open St. Peter's Parish in Manhattan, the first Catholic parish in New York City. The congregation purchased land for a new church from Trinity Church, supplement community donations with a gift of 1,000 silver pieces from King Charles III of Spain. The St. Peter's Church was dedicated in 1787; its worshippers included Sister Elizabeth Ann Seton and the philanthropist Pierre Toussaint. In 1800, the congregation opened a school at St. Peter's, the first Catholic school in New York.

On November 6, 1789, Pius VI raised the Apostolic Prefecture of United States to the Diocese of Baltimore, headed by the first American bishop, John Carroll. For the next nine years, Carroll was in charge of the Catholic Church in New York State along with the rest of the nation. The second Catholic church in New York State, and the first outside of New York City, was St. Mary's Church in Albany, New York, founded in 1796.

=== 1808 to 1820 ===
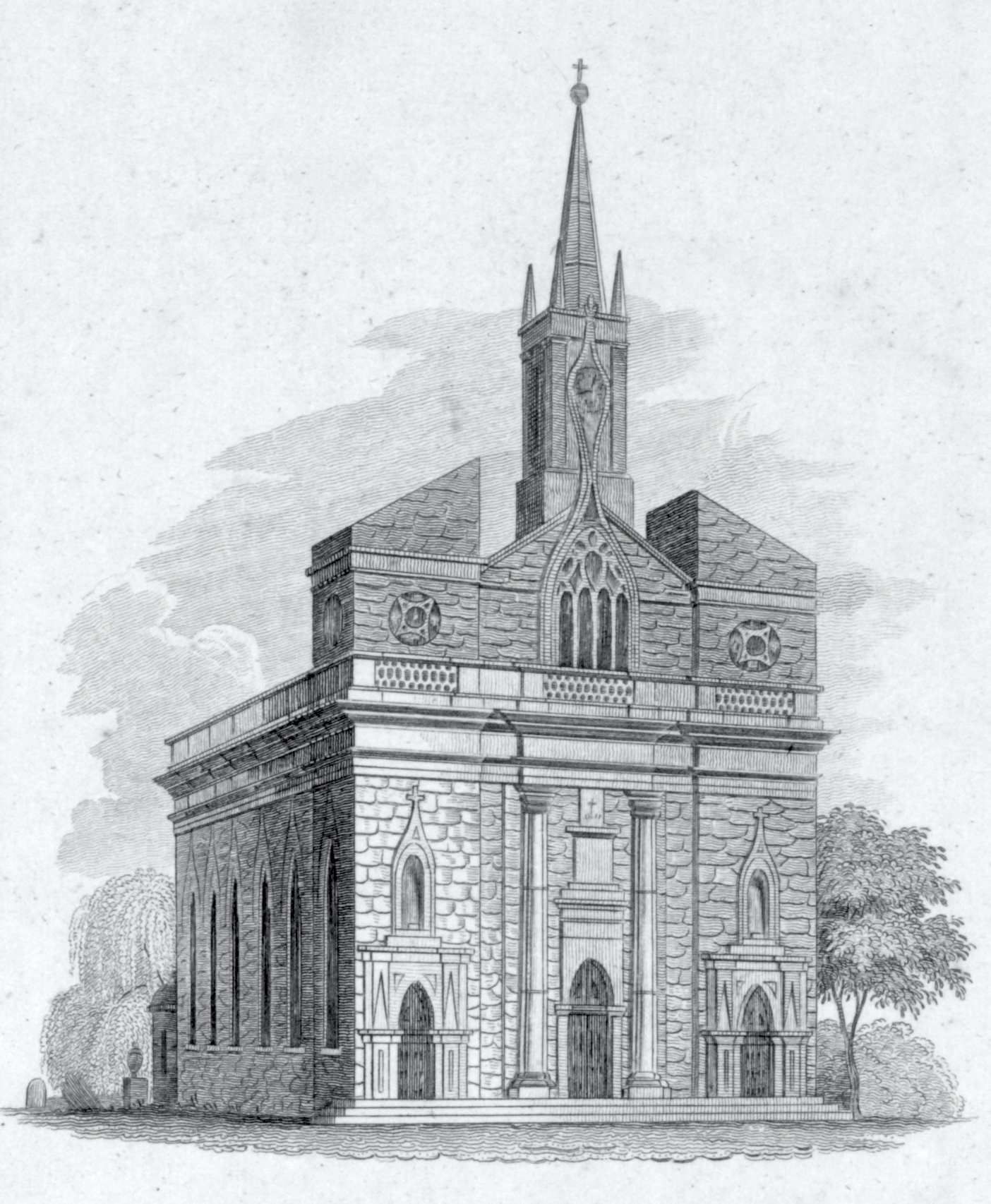
Original St. Patrick's Cathedral in Manhattan (1830)

On April 8, 1808, Pope Pius VII erected the Diocese of New York and three other dioceses, taking their territory from the Diocese of Baltimore. He simultaneously elevated the Diocese of Baltimore to a metropolitan archdiocese and assigned all four new sees as its suffragans. At the time of its formation, the Diocese of New York included:

- the entire State of New York
- Sussex, Bergen, Morris, Essex, Somerset, Middlesex, and Monmouth counties in northeastern New Jersey.

Pius VII appointed Monsignor R. Luke Concanen, then serving in Rome, as the first Bishop of New York. However, he was prevented from sailing to New York by a French blockade. On Carroll's recommendation, Concanen appointed Anthony Kohlmann, rector of St. Peter's Parish, to administer the diocese as his vicar general. Kohlman traveled extensively throughout the new diocese, celebrating masses and providing sacraments to individuals. To relieve overcrowding at St. Peter's, Kohlman started construction in 1809 of the original Cathedral of St. Patrick in Lower Manhattan. He also established the New York Literary Institution, the first Catholic school in the new diocese. Concanen died in Italy in 1810, having never made it to the United States.

On October 4, 1814, John Connolly was appointed the second Bishop of New York by Pius VII. When Connolly arrived in New York, the diocese had four priests and three churches: St. Peter's and St. Patrick's Cathedral in New York City, and St. Mary's in Albany. The Catholic population of the diocese was approximately 15,000, primarily Irish with some English, French and Germans.

In 1817, Connolly invited the Sisters of Charity in Emmitsburg, Maryland, to open the first Catholic orphanage in New York City. During his tenure, Connolly traveled over 1,000 miles on horseback through the diocese. He spent a great deal of time ministering to Irish immigrants building the Erie Canal in Upstate New York. The first parish in Utica, St. John's, was erected in 1819. In 1823, St. Patrick's Parish was founded in Rochester, the first in that city. Connolly died on February 6, 1825.

=== 1825 to 1840 ===
To replace Connolly, Pope Leo XII in 1826 named John Dubois as the next Bishop of New York. At the time of his consecration, the diocese had 18 priests, 12 churches and a Catholic population of 150,000. Dubois faced a primarily Irish Catholic population that was not happy over the Vatican appointing a French bishop. Desperately needing a seminary to prepare more priests, Dubois spent two years in Europe trying to raise funds. Back in New York, Dubois built his first seminary in Nyack in 1833, but it burned down the next year. He later opened another seminary in Lafargeville in northern New York. He also fought a long battle with the trustees of the first St. Patrick's Cathedral over administration of that facility.

In 1837, Pope Gregory XVI appointed John J. Hughes as coadjutor bishop of New York at Dubois' request, Unlike previous Catholic leaders in New York, Hughes did not try to build bonds with Protestant leaders and was very willing to fight for what he deemed as the rights of Catholics.

In 1840, Hughes started a campaign to persuade the Public School Society, which ran the public schools in New York City, to allocated seven schools for Catholic students and teachers. Hughes argued Catholics students in the existing schools were being forced to hear readings from the Protestant King James Bible. When the Society refused, he started lobbying the State of New York to subsidize Catholic schools.

In 1841, Hughes founded St. John's College in the Bronx. Later to become Fordham University, St. John's was the first Catholic institution of higher learning in the Northeastern United States. Realizing that the Lafargeville seminary was too distant from New York City, Hughes that same year moved it to the new St. John's campus. Despite Hughes' lobbying, the New York State Legislature passed the Maclay Act in 1842, which prohibited public funding of religious schools.

=== 1840 to 1850 ===
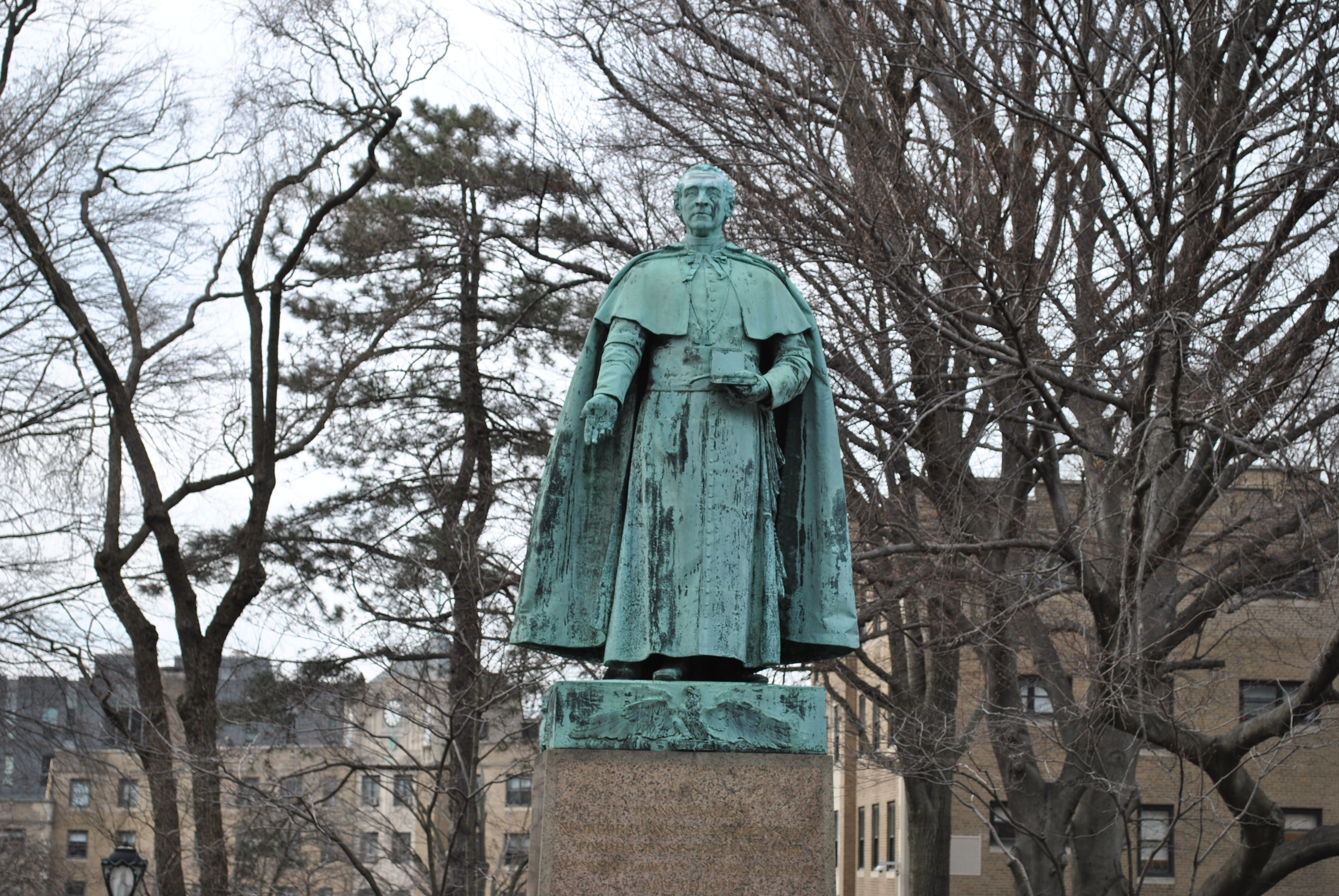
Statue of Bishop Hughes at Fordham University (2013)

When Dubois died in 1842, Hughes automatically succeeded him as bishop of New York. Having lost the legal battle over public funding of Catholic schools, Hughes worked to establish a Catholic political party. One of his other priorities was to address parish debts and loosen the control of boards of trustees over these parishes. Hughes decided to found an independent Catholic school system in the city, staffed by members of religious orders. During his tenure as bishop, he opened over 24 schools. By 1870, 19 percent of the city's children were attending Catholic schools.

The difficulties faced by Catholics at the time included anti-Catholic bigotry in general and in the New York school system. They also faced a strong Nativist movement that failed to keep Catholics out of the country, but warned that control by "the Papacy" was a threat to American republicanism.

On April 23, 1847, Pope Pius IX erected the Diocese of Albany and the Diocese of Buffalo. This left the Diocese of New York with the following areas:

- New York City (then just Manhattan)
- Richmond County
- Long Island, consisting of the City of Brooklyn, the remainder of Kings County, Queens County, and Suffolk County
- Seven counties in New Jersey
- Seven counties in New York north of New York City

=== 1850 to 1885 ===
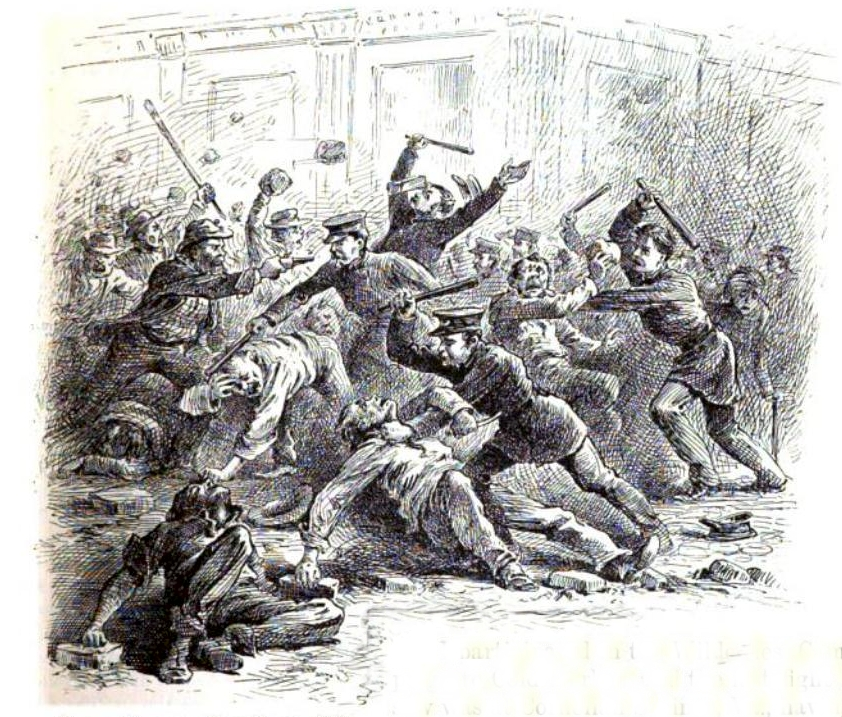
1863 Draft Riots (1895)

On July 19, 1850, Pius IX elevated the Diocese of New York to an archdiocese, making Hughes the first archbishop of New York. On July 29, 1853, to address the burgeoning Catholic population in New York and New Jersey, Pius IX created two new American dioceses:

- The Diocese of Newark, which took all the New Jersey counties from the new archdiocese
- The Diocese of Brooklyn, which took all of Long Island, consisting of the City of Brooklyn, the remainder of Kings County, Queens County (which still included what later became Nassau County), and Suffolk County

At this point, the new archdiocese consisted of New York City, Richmond County, and the seven counties north of the city. In 1858, Hughes laid the cornerstone for the present St. Patrick's Cathedral in Manhattan.

In July 1863, during the American Civil War, Hughes used his influence to help stop the Draft Riots in Lower Manhattan. They were started by Irish working men as a protest against their conscription into the Union Army. However, the protests soon devolved into mass violence with widespread destruction throughout the city. Some rioters specifically targeted African-Americans, lynching several. Very ill at the time, Hughes appeared on his balcony to address several thousand people, urging them to be peaceful and loyal to the United States. Other priests in Manhattan confronted mobs, stopping their rampages. Hughes died on January 3, 1864.

To replace Hughes, Pope Pius IX named Bishop John McCloskey in January 1865 as the second archbishop of New York. When the original St. Patrick’s Cathedral was destroyed by fire in 1866, he rebuilt it in two years. McCloskey presided over the dedication of the present Patrick's Cathedral in 1879. In October 1880, Pope Leo XIII named Bishop Michael Corrigan as coadjutor archbishop to assist the aged McCloskey.

In response to the growing Catholic population in New York, McCloskey established 88 new parishes, including the first parish for African-Americans along with new parishes for the Polish and Italian communities. The number of priests rose from 150 to 400 during his tenure. At the time of McCloskey's death in 1885, there were 37,000 children enrolled at archdiocesan schools. He also established several charitable societies for children and a hospital for the mentally ill.

On July 25, 1885, Pope Leo XIII transferred the Bahamas to the Archdiocese of New York.The shipping connections between New York City and the islands made it easier for the archdiocese to administer them. This situation would continue until 1932.

=== 1885 to 1900 ===
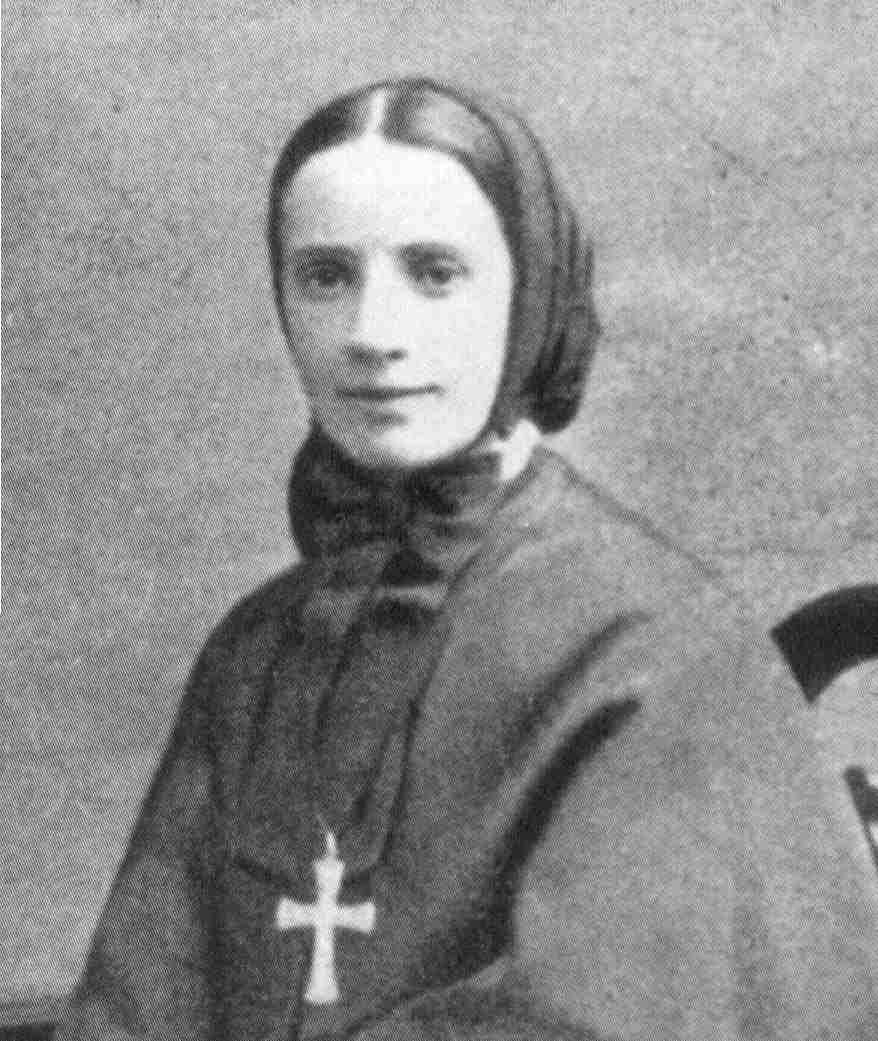
Mother Cabrini (pre-1917)

McCloskey died on October 18, 1885; Corrigan automatically succeeded him as archbishop.

During the 1886 mayoral campaign in New York City, Edward McGlynn, pastor of St. Stephen's Parish in Manhattan, announced that he would speak at a political rally for the journalist Henry George, the candidate of the United Labor Party. Corrigan, who was very close to the Democratic political machine at Tammany Hall, had had previous conflicts with McGlynn over his political affiliations. He ordered McGlynn to cancel his speech. McGlynn delivered the speech anyway and Corrigan immediately removed him as pastor of St. Stephen's. McGlynn was excommunicated by the Vatican in 1887.

In the 1880s, the Vatican became concerned that the Catholic hierarchy in the United States, dominated by Irish prelates, was neglecting the needs of the increasing numbers of Catholic Italian immigrants. The Vatican rebuked Corrigan in 1887 for neglecting the Italians and treating them in a humiliating way. Some Irish parishes would only allow Italians to attend Mass in church basements. Corrigan refused to open Italian parishes, claiming that the Italians were "not very clean" and were too poor to support them.

Sister (and later Saint) Frances Xavier Cabrini arrived in New York in 1889 from Italy to establish an orphanage in Manhattan. When she met with Corrigan, he told her that he would not allow her orphanage and that she should return to Italy. Cabrini told him that, “I am here by order of the Holy See, and here I must stay.” At that point, Corrigan relented and invited Cabrini to work in the schools. He later allowed her to open an orphanage. In 1891, Corrigan started work on St. Joseph's Seminary in Yonkers.

=== 1900 to 1967 ===
By 1900, the archdiocese had over 55,000 students enrolled in its schools.

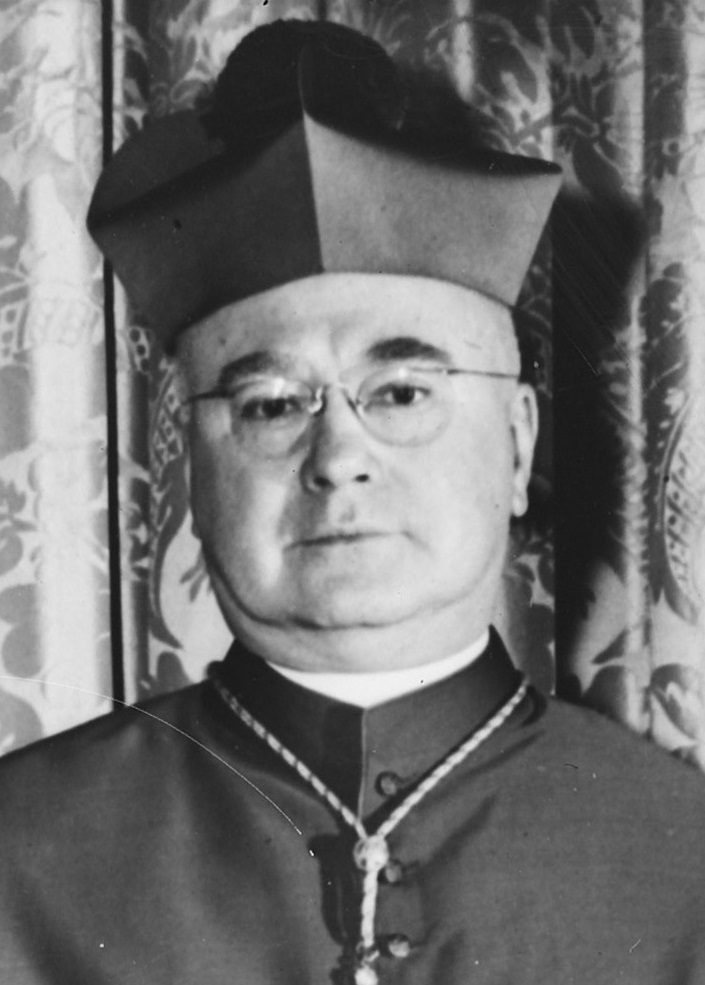
Cardinal Spellman (1946)

In 1902, after a fall at the St. Joseph's construction site, Corrigan developed pneumonia and died. Leo XIII appointed Auxiliary Bishop John Farley on September 15, 1902, as Corrigan's replacement as archbishop. Farley established nearly fifty new parochial schools within his first eight years as archbishop. After Farley died in 1918, Pope Benedict XV appointed Bishop Patrick Hayes on March 10, 1919, as archbishop. That same year, near the end of World War I, the Vatican named Hayes as the apostolic vicar of the Military Vicariate of the United States. This gave him jurisdiction to minister to American servicemen and women throughout the world. Succeeding archbishops of New York retained this position for the next few decades.

Pope Pius XI erected the Apostolic Prefecture of Bahama on March 21, 1929, starting its separation from the Archdiocese of New York. When Hayes died in 1938, Pope Pius XI appointed Auxiliary Bishop Francis Spellman on April 15, 1939, as Archbishop of New York.

In 1949, the 240 gravediggers at the Catholic cemeteries in the archdiocese went on strike. After negotiations with the union broke down, Spellman led a group seminarians to dig the graves at one cemetery. Spellman eventually reached a settlement with the union.

During his long tenure as archbishop, Spellman raised over $500 million for the construction of schools, churches, and other institutions. During a five-year period in the 1950s, he constructed 15 churches, 94 schools, 22 rectories, 60 convents and 34 other institutions in the archdiocese. Spellman died of a stroke on December 3, 1967.

=== 1967 to 2000 ===
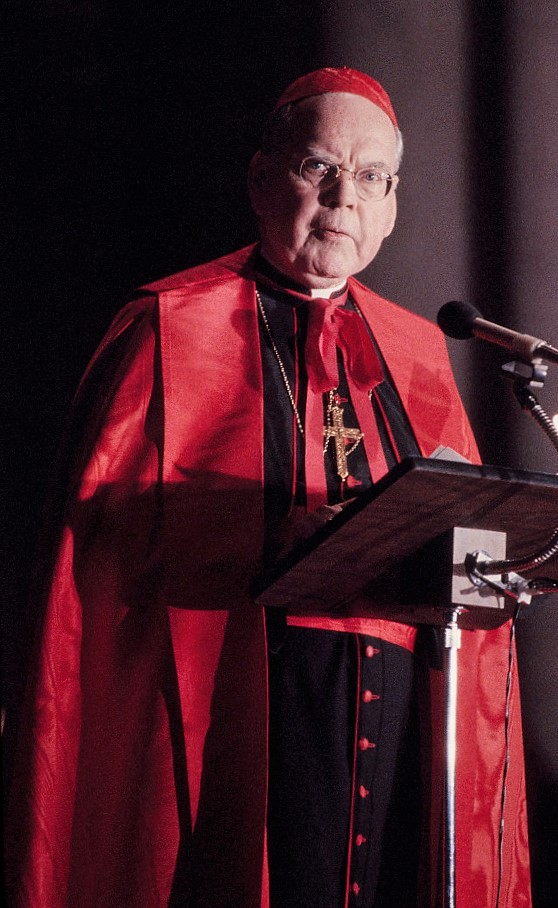
Cardinal Cooke (1983)

After Spellman's death, Pope Paul VI named Auxiliary Bishop Terence Cooke as the seventh Archbishop of New York on March 2, 1968. Cooke helped implement the reforms of the Second Vatican Council in the archdiocese, and adopted a more collegial management style than Spellman. During his tenure as archbishop, Cooke founded the following bodies and institutions:

- Birthright, an organization providing counseling and other support for pregnant women
- Inner-City Scholarship Fund, to provide financial aid for Catholic school students
- an archdiocesan housing development program for the poor
- Catholic New York, the archdiocesan newspaper
- nine nursing homes.

On October 6, 1983, Cooke died from leukemia. To replace him Pope John Paul II named Bishop John O'Connor on January 26, 1984. In 1986, the Vatican erected the Archdiocese for the Military Services, USA, removing jurisdiction for Catholic ministry to servicemen and women from the Archbishop of New York. In 1990, O'Connor started the canonization process for Pierre Toussaint, the formerly enslaved man from Haiti who became a Catholic philanthropist in the 19th century.

=== 2000 to present ===
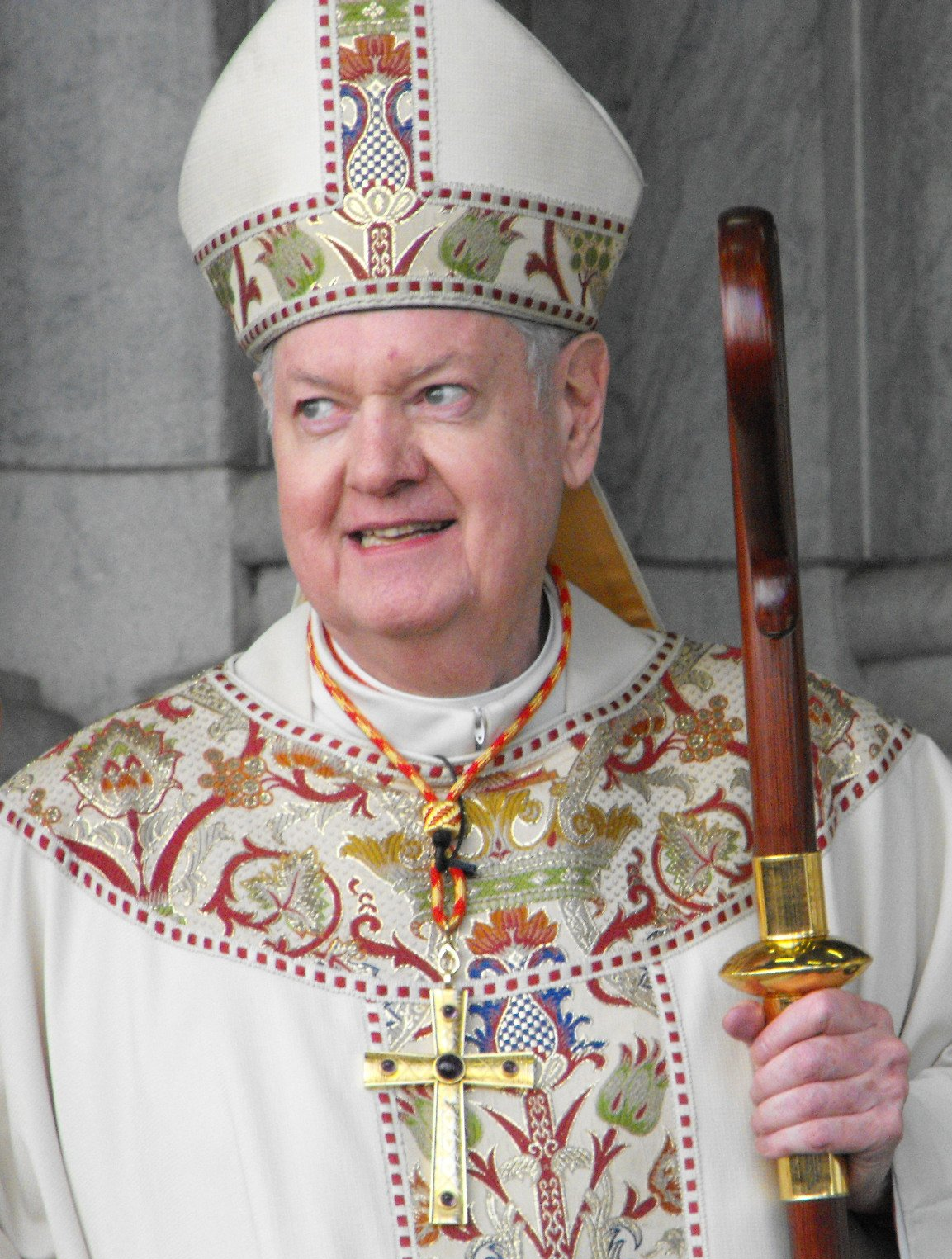
Cardinal Egan (2009)

After O'Connor died on May 3, 2000, John Paul II appointed Bishop Edward Egan as archbishop on May 11, 2000. After the September 11 terrorist attacks in Manhattan in 2001, Egan went to the disaster scene. He ministered to the injured and anointed the dead. He established a center for victims' families at the New School in Manhattan and an interfaith service at Yankee Stadium in the Bronx. For retired priests, Egan established the John Cardinal O'Connor residence in 2003 at the previous site of the minor seminary in the Bronx.

In 2007, Egan announced the closure of ten under-utilized parishes and the merging of 11 other parishes. He also established five new parishes; three in Orange County, and one each in Staten Island and Dutchess County. He also approved building projects for nine parishes.

In 2008, the archdiocese celebrated the bicentennial of its establishment as a diocese. To mark the occasion, Pope Benedict XVI visited the archdiocese from April 18 to April 20, 2008. During his visit, Benedict visited St. Patrick's Cathedral, the United Nations, Ground Zero, St. Joseph's Parish in Yorkville, and St. Joseph's Seminary in Yonkers. The pope also celebrated a mass at Yankee Stadium. When Egan retired on February 23, 2009, Benedict XVI named Archbishop Timothy Dolan as the 10th Archbishop of New York.

Soon after his arrival in New York, Dolan oversaw a widely consultative pair of "strategic planning" processes, examining the archdiocese's hundreds of grade schools ("Pathways to Excellence", 2009–2013) and parishes ("Making All Things New", 2010–2015). Ultimately, Dolan announced that the archdiocese would close or merge dozens of underutilized schools and parishes. This was due to decades-long trends of shifting populations, increasing expenses, declining attendance, and decreasing clergy.

In November 2010, the archdiocese announced the closing of 32 schools. The archdiocese in 2017 announced that it was applying for a $100 million mortgage on the Lotte New York Palace Hotel, one of its properties in Manhattan, to pay victims of sexual abuse by its clergy who had not sued the archdiocese. In August 2018, the archdiocese reported that between 2016 and 2018, its Independent Reconciliation and Compensation Program paid nearly $60 million to 278 victims of sex abuse by clergy. On September 26, 2018, it was reported that the Archdiocese of New York, and the three other dioceses where Theodore McCarrick served as a bishop, were facing an investigation by the United States Conference of Catholic Bishops for McCarrick's alleged sex abuse. On January 28, 2019, the New York State Assembly and Senate passed a law allowing prosecutors to bring criminal charges until a victim turned 28, and permitting victims to sue until age 55. Governor Andrew Cuomo signed the bill into law on February 14, 2019.

On April 26, 2019, the archdiocese released a list of 120 clergy accused of committing acts of sexual abuse. Some of those on the list, which included both male and female church workers, had been convicted of crimes and many others were deceased. Cardinal Dolan released a letter of apology, asking for forgiveness.

On August 14, 2019, James Grien, who accused McCarrick of sexually abusing him when McCarrick was an auxiliary bishop of New York, sued the archdiocese. In his lawsuit, Grien also stated that McCarrick's status as a friend of his family allowed him to continue to visit and sexually abuse him after leaving the archdiocese in 1981.

On September 30, 2019, Dolan released a report written by Barbara S. Jones, a former judge and prosecutor. Her report stated that the archdiocese had completed the process of removing all of its remaining accused clergy from active ministry. In the same report, Jones recommended that the archdiocese also hire a sex abuse "czar" to vet all complaints. Jones, who was commissioned by Dolan in 2018 to conduct the review of the church's handling of abuse allegations, also recommended hiring "a compliance officer for the Office of Priest Personnel to monitor its functions and oversee the new document management system". Dolan also backed the Jones Report and stated at a press conference that the archdiocese was expanding its sex abuse policy as well.

On October 10, 2019, Pope Francis had accepted the resignation of Auxiliary Bishop John Jenik following an accusation of sex abuse. Appointed auxiliary bishop by Francis in 2014, Jenik also served as vicar for the Northwest Bronx, appointed by Dolan's predecessor Edward Egan in 2006. Jenik, who had submitted his resignation letter upon turning 75 in March 2019, had been out of public ministry since October 2018 after the allegation surfaced.

On May 8, 2020, Cuomo extended the 2019 New York Child Victim Act's statute of limitations deadline to file sex abuse lawsuits to January 14, 2021. On July 27, 2020, a priest who served in Orange County was named in a new sex abuse lawsuit. Eight men alleged that the George Boxelaar, who died in 1990, sexually abused them when they were children during the 1970s and 1980s. They added their claims to three other alleged victims of Boxelaar. In addition to these new lawsuits, a Scarsdale Catholic school teacher identified as Edwin Gaylor also confessed to committing acts of sex abuse.

In October 2025, Ronald Hicks, Archbishop of New York, wrote that the archdiocese was now 'on the verge of offering those affected some measure of healing and reconciliation'. According to the New York Times, each of the approximately 1,300 victims of abuse is to receive at least $250,000. The settlement is the result of years of negotiations. In January 2024, Dolan announced that the archdiocese would move its offices from the Terence Cardinal Cooke Catholic Building in Manhattan to another location close to St. Patrick's Cathedral. In February 2025, Dolan submitted his resignation to Pope Francis, as is required for all bishops on their 75th birthday. Francis died before accepting his resignation. Newly elected Pope Leo XIV accepted Dolan's resignation on December 18, 2025, and appointed Ronald Aldon Hicks as his successor.

== Archdiocesan demographics ==
As of 2023, the Catholic population of the archdiocese was 2,642,740. These Catholics were served by 320 archdiocesan priests, 195 priests of religious orders, and 140 international priests. The archdiocese had 228 permanent deacons and 443 men and women religious. In comparison, in 1929 the Catholic population of the archdiocese was 1,273,291, with 1,314 clergy and 444 churches. Over 170,348 children were enrolled in Catholic educational and welfare institutions.

As of 2023, the archdiocese had 60 men enrolled in its priestly formation program.

== Anniversaries and memorials ==
- January 4th – Memorial of Saint Elizabeth Ann Seton
- January 5th– Memorial of Saint John Neumann
- March 17th– Solemnity of Saint Patrick, patronal feast for both the archdiocese and the cathedral
- April 8th – Anniversary of the establishment of the Diocese of New York in 1808
- July 14th – Memorial of Saint Kateri Tekakwitha
- September 5th – Memorial of Saint Teresa of Calcutta
- October 5th – Anniversary of the dedication of the Cathedral of Saint Patrick in 1910
- November 13th – Memorial of Saint Frances Xavier Cabrini

== Leadership ==
The following is a list of bishops and archbishops of New York, including its auxiliary bishops.

=== Bishops of New York ===
1. R. Luke Concanen (1808–1810)
2. John Connolly (1814–1825)
3. John Dubois (1826–1842)
4. John Hughes (1842–1850; coadjutor bishop 1838–1842), elevated to archbishop
  – John McCloskey (coadjutor 1844–1847) – Bishop of Albany; later returned as archbishop in 1864

=== Archbishops of New York ===
1. John Hughes (1850–1864)
2. John McCloskey (1864–1885) (cardinal in 1875)
3. Michael Corrigan (1885–1902; coadjutor archbishop 1880–1885)
4. John Farley (1902–1918) (cardinal in 1911)
5. Patrick Hayes (1919–1938) (cardinal in 1924)
6. Francis Spellman (1939–1967) (cardinal in 1946)
  – James Francis McIntyre (coadjutor 1946–1948) – Archbishop of Los Angeles
  – John Joseph Maguire (coadjutor 1965–1980), did not have right of succession
7. Terence Cooke (1968–1983) (cardinal in 1969)
8. John O'Connor (1984–2000) (cardinal in 1985)
9. Edward Egan (2000–2009) (cardinal in 2001)
10. Timothy Dolan (2009–2025) (cardinal in 2012)
11. Ronald Hicks (2026–present)

=== Current Auxiliary Bishops of New York ===
- Edmund Whalen (2019)
- Gerardo Joseph Colacicco (2019)
- Joseph A. Espaillat (2022)

=== Former Auxiliary Bishops of New York ===
- John Farley (1895–1902) – Archbishop of New York
- Thomas Cusack (1904–1915) – Bishop of Albany
- Patrick Hayes (1914–1919) – Archbishop of New York
- John Joseph Dunn (1921–1933)
- Stephen Joseph Donahue (1934–1972)
- James Francis McIntyre (1941–1946) – Coadjutor Archbishop of New York, then Archbishop of Los Angeles (cardinal in 1953)
- Joseph Patrick Donahue (1945–1959)
- Thomas John McDonnell (1947–1951) – Coadjutor Bishop of Wheeling
- Joseph Francis Flannelly (1948–1969)
- Fulton J. Sheen (1951–1966) – Bishop of Rochester, then appointed titular archbishop
- Walter P. Kellenberg (1953–1954) – Bishop of Ogdensburg, then Bishop of Rockville Centre
- Edward Vincent Dargin (1953–1973)
- Joseph Maria Pernicone (1954–1978)
- James Henry Ambrose Griffiths (1955–1964)
- John Michael Fearns (1957–1972)
- John Joseph Maguire (1959–1965) – Coadjutor Archbishop of New York
- Edward Ernest Swanstrom (1960–1978)
- James Edward McManus (1963–1970), previously Bishop of Ponce
- George Henry Guilfoyle (1964–1968) – Bishop of Camden
- Terence Cooke (1965–1968) – Archbishop of New York
- Edwin Broderick (1967–1969) – Bishop of Albany
- Edward Dennis Head (1970–1973) – Bishop of Buffalo
- Patrick Vincent Ahern (1970–1994)
- James Patrick Mahoney (1972–1997)
- Anthony Francis Mestice (1973–2001)
- Theodore Edgar McCarrick (1977–1982) – the first Bishop of Metuchen, then Archbishop of Newark and later Archbishop of Washington (cardinal 2001–2018), laicized (2019)
- Austin Bernard Vaughan (1977–2000)
- Francisco Garmendia (1977–2001)
- Joseph Thomas O'Keefe (1982–1987) – Bishop of Syracuse
- Emerson John Moore (1982–1995)
- Edward Egan (1985–1988) – Bishop of Bridgeport, then Archbishop of New York
- William Jerome McCormack (1987–2001)
- Patrick Sheridan (1990–2001)
- Henry J. Mansell (1992–1995) – Bishop of Buffalo, then Archbishop of Hartford
- Edwin Frederick O'Brien (1996–1997) – Archbishop for the Military Services, USA, then Archbishop of Baltimore and later grand master of the Order of the Holy Sepulchre (cardinal in 2012)
- Robert Anthony Brucato (1997–2006)
- James Francis McCarthy (1999–2002)
- Timothy A. McDonnell (2001–2004) – Bishop of Springfield in Massachusetts
- Josu Iriondo (2001–2014)
- Dominick John Lagonegro (2001–2018)
- Dennis Joseph Sullivan (2004–2013) – Bishop of Camden
- Gerald Thomas Walsh (2004–2017)
- John Joseph Jenik (2014–2019)
- John Joseph O'Hara (2014–2021)
- John S. Bonnici (2022–2026) – Bishop of Rochester
- Peter John Byrne (2014–2026)

== Other archdiocesan priests who became bishops ==
- Benedict Joseph Fenwick – Bishop of Boston (1825)
- William Quarter – first Bishop of Chicago (1843)
- Andrew Byrne – first Bishop of Little Rock (1844)
- Bernard O'Reilly – Bishop of Hartford (1850)
- Saint John Neumann – Bishop of Philadelphia (1852)
- James Roosevelt Bayley – first Bishop of Newark (1853), then Archbishop of Baltimore (1872)
- John Loughlin – first Bishop of Brooklyn (1853)
- David William Bacon – first Bishop of Portland (1855)
- Francis Patrick McFarland – Vicar Apostolic of Florida (1857, never took office) and Bishop of Hartford (1858)
- John J. Conroy – Bishop of Albany (1865)
- William George McCloskey – Bishop of Louisville (1868)
- Bernard John McQuaid – first Bishop of Rochester (1868)
- Francis McNeirny – Coadjutor Bishop of Albany (1871), then Bishop of Albany (1877)
- William Hickley Gross – Bishop of Savannah (1873), then Archbishop of Oregon City (1885)
- John Lancaster Spalding – first Bishop of Peoria (1876)
- Michael J. O'Farrell – first Bishop of Trenton (1881)
- Henry P. Northrop – Vicar Apostolic of North Carolina (1881) and Bishop of Charleston (1883)
- Charles Edward McDonnell – Bishop of Brooklyn (1892)
- Henry Gabriels, – Bishop of Ogdensburg (1892)
- Thomas O'Gorman – Bishop of Sioux Falls (1896)
- Charles H. Colton – Bishop of Buffalo (1903)
- Bonaventure Broderick – Auxiliary Bishop of Havana (1903)
- John T. McNicholas – Bishop of Duluth (1918), then Archbishop of Cincinnati (1925)
- Francis Joseph Tief – Bishop of Concordia (1920)
- Daniel Joseph Curley – Bishop of Syracuse (1923)
- John Joseph Mitty – Bishop of Salt Lake City (1926), then Coadjutor Archbishop of San Francisco (1932) and later Archbishop of San Francisco (1935)
- Joseph Francis Rummel – Bishop of Omaha (1928), then Archbishop of New Orleans (1935)
- James E. Kearney – Bishop of Salt Lake City (1932), then Bishop of Rochester (1937)
- Bryan Joseph McEntegart – Bishop of Ogdensburg (1943), then Bishop of Brooklyn (1957)
- William Scully – Coadjutor Bishop of Albany (1945), then Bishop of Albany (1954)
- Patrick Aloysius O'Boyle – Archbishop of Washington (1947) (cardinal in 1967)
- Christopher Joseph Weldon – Bishop of Springfield in Massachusetts (1950)
- Philip Joseph Furlong – Auxiliary Bishop for the Military Services, USA (1956)
- Francis Frederick Reh – Bishop of Charleston (1962), then Bishop of Saginaw (1968)
- Thomas Andrew Donnellan – Bishop of Ogdensburg (1964), then Archbishop of Atlanta (1968)
- Charles Borromeo McLaughlin – Auxiliary Bishop of Raleigh (1964), then first Bishop of Saint Petersburg (1968)
- Thomas C. Kelly – Auxiliary Bishop of Washington (1977), then Archbishop of Louisville (1982)
- Joseph Thomas Dimino – Auxiliary Bishop for the Military Services, USA (1983), then Archbishop for the Military Services, USA (1991)
- Roberto González Nieves – Auxiliary Bishop of Boston (1988), then Bishop of Corpus Christi and later then Archbishop of San Juan (1999)
- Rrok Kola Mirdita – Archbishop of Tiranë-Durrës (1993)
- Emilio S. Allué – Auxiliary Bishop of Boston (1996)
- Charles Daniel Balvo – apostolic nuncio to Australia and titular archbishop (2005)
- Charles John Brown – apostolic nuncio the Philippines and titular archbishop (2011)
- William James Muhm – Auxiliary Bishop for the Military Services, USA (2019)

== Parishes ==
As of 2026, the Archdiocese of New York has approximately 300 parishes in New York City and seven counties north of the city.

== Schools ==
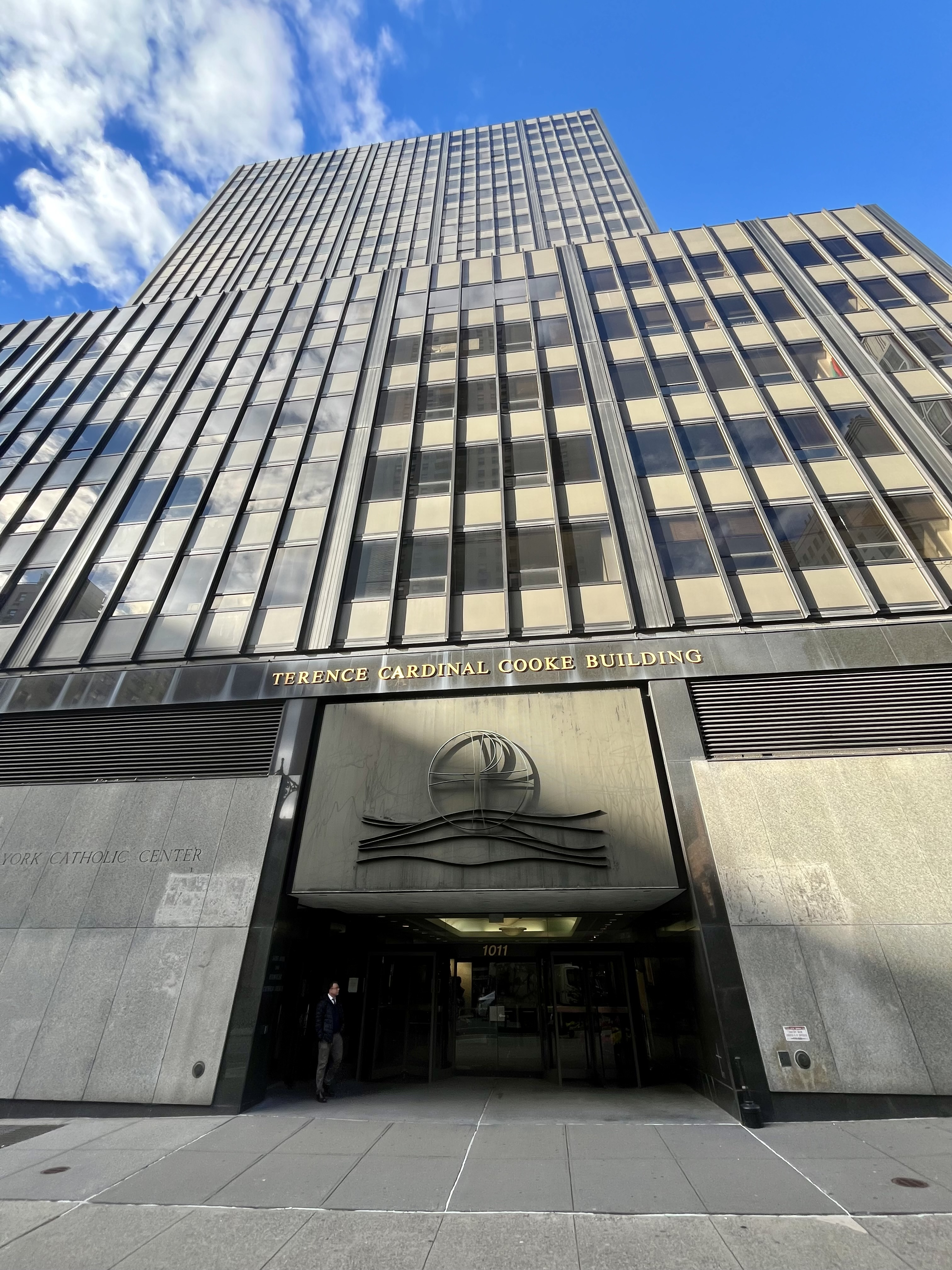
The Catholic Schools of the Archdiocese of New York is headquartered in the Terence Cardinal Cooke Building in Manhattan

As of 2026, the Catholic Schools in the Archdiocese of New York, the archdiocesan school system, operates 153 schools with a total enrollment of approximately 49,000. It is headquartered in the Cooke Building in Midtown Manhattan.

== Cemeteries ==
Calvary & Allied Cemeteries, an archdiocesan organization, operates six of following cemeteries, which are marked in yellow. All other cemeteries are operated by individual parishes.

Cemetery	Location	Operator	Notes
New York City
Calvary	Queens	Calvary & Allied Cemeteries	Opened 1847; belongs to the Archdiocese of New York even though Queens is part of the Diocese of Brooklyn
Resurrection	Staten Island	Calvary & Allied Cemeteries	Opened 1980
St. Patrick's	Manhattan	St. Patrick's Old Cathedral	Only Catholic cemetery in Manhattan
St. Peter's	Staten Island	Parish of Our Lady of Good Counsel–St. Peter–St. Paul & Assumption	
St. Raymond's	Bronx	St. Raymond Parish	Only Catholic cemetery in the Bronx
Westchester County
All Souls	Pleasantville	Holy Innocents Parish	
Assumption	Cortlandt Manor	Assumption Parish	
Gate of Heaven	Valhalla	Calvary & Allied Cemeteries	Opened 1917
Holy Mount	Eastchester	Immaculate Conception–Assumption Parish	
Holy Sepulchre	New Rochelle	Blessed Sacrament Parish	
Mount Calvary	White Plains	St. John the Evangelist/Our Lady of Carmel Parish	
St. Francis of Assisi	Mount Kisco	St. Francis of Assisi	
St. Joseph	Yonkers	St. Joseph Parish	
St. Mary	Yonkers	St. Peter/St. Denis/St. Mary Parish	
St. Mary	Rye Brook	Calvary & Allied Cemeteries	Established 1863 by Our Lady of Mercy Parish in Port Chester, New York; acquired by Calvary & Allied Cemeteries in 2018
Rockland County
Ascension	Airmont	Calvary & Allied Cemeteries	Opened 1966
Orange County
Calvary	Newburgh	St. Patrick/St. Mary's/Our Lady of the Lakes Parish	
St. Anastasia	Harriman	St. Anastasia Parish	
St. John's	Goshen	St. John the Evangelist Parish	
St. Joseph	Florida	St. Joseph Parish	
St. Joseph	Middletown	St. Joseph Parish	
St. Mary	Port Jervis	Immaculate Conception Parish	
St. Mary	Washingtonville	St. Mary/St. Columba Parish	
St. Stephen	Warwick	St. Stephen–St. Edward Parish	
St. Thomas	Cornwall-on-Hudson	St. Marianne Cope Parish	
Dutchess County
Calvary	Poughkeepsie	St. Martin de Porres Parish	
Sacred Heart	Barrytown	St. Christopher Parish	
St. Denis	Hopewell Junction	St. Denis Parish	
St. Joachim	Beacon	St. Joachim-St. John the Evangelist Parish	
St. John	Pawling	St. John the Evangelist/St. Charles Borromeo Parish	
St. Joseph	Millbrook	St. Joseph/Immaculate Conception Parish	
St. Mary	Wappingers Falls	St. Mary Parish	
St. Patrick	Millerton	Immaculate Conception/St. Anthony Parish	
St. Peter	Poughkeepsie	St. Peter Parish	
St. Sylvia	Tivoli	St. Sylvia Parish	
Sullivan County
St. Joseph	Wurtsboro	St. Joseph Parish	
Ulster County
St. Ann	Kingston	Calvary & Allied Cemeteries	Acquired by Calvary & Allied Cemeteries in 2021
St. Peter	Kingston	St. Mary/Sacred Heart	

== Religious figures associated with archdiocese ==
=== Saints ===
- Elizabeth Ann Seton – founder of the American branch of Sisters of Charity in the 19th century, first saint from New York and first native-born American saint. Canonized in 1975
- Frances Xavier Cabrini – founder of Missionary Sisters of the Sacred Heart of Jesus in the 19th century; first US citizen made a saint. Canonized in 1946
- Isaac Jogues – Jesuit missionary who was active in the British Province of New York during the 17th century. Canonized in 1930
- John Nepomucene Neumann – New York diocesan priest, later a Redemptorist, fourth Bishop of Philadelphia, founder of the first Catholic diocesan school system in the United States and the first American bishop to become a saint. Canonized in 1977
- Kateri Tekakwitha – lived in Upstate New York in the 17th century, first Native American saint. Canonized in 2012

=== Venerables ===
- Fulton J. Sheen – archbishop; prominent radio, former auxiliary bishop of the archdiocese, and television preacher in the 20th century. Declared venerable in 2012
- Pierre Toussaint – Former enslaved person in Haiti; New York businessman and philanthropist in the 19th century. Declared a venerable in 1996
- Rose Hawthorne Lathrop – founder of Dominican Sisters of Hawthorne as Mother Mary Alphonsa. Declared venerable in 2024

=== Servants of God ===
- Isaac Hecker – Redemptorist priest in the 19th century; founder of Paulist Fathers. Named servant of God in 2008
- Vincent R. Capodanno – Maryknoll missionary of the 20 century; also U.S. Navy chaplain, Vietnam War hero; Congressional Medal of Honor recipient. Named a servant of God in 2006
- Terence Cooke – archbishop and cardinal in New York in the 20th century. Founder of many charitable programs. Named a servant of God in 1992
- Dorothy Day – social activist and radical in New York in the 20th century; co-founder of Catholic Worker movement and newspaper. Named a servant of God in 2000

== Major shrines ==
- National Shrine of Our Lady of Mount Carmel – (Middletown)
- Salesian National Shrine of Mary Help of Christians – (Stony Point)
- Shrine of St. Elizabeth Ann Bayley Seton – (Manhattan) located in the Church of Our Lady of the Rosary
- St. Frances Xavier Cabrini Shrine – (Manhattan)

== Province of New York ==
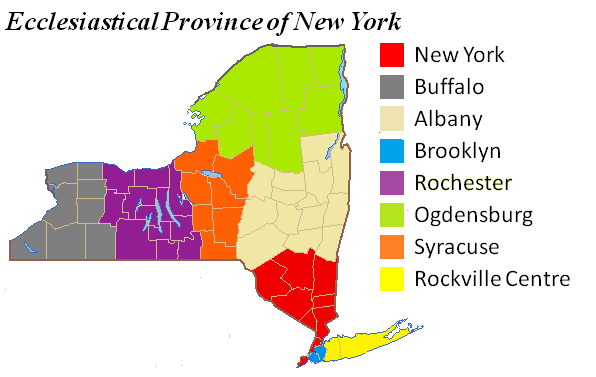
Ecclesiastical Province of New York

== See also ==
- Irish Americans in New York City
- Diocese of Brooklyn
- History of education in New York City
- History of the Catholic Church in the United States
- Category:People of Roman Catholic Archdiocese of New York
- John P. Chidwick – New York diocesan priest; chaplain on USS Maine
- Sisters of Life – founded in 1991 by John Joseph O'Connor, Cardinal Archbishop of New York
