= List of churches in the Diocese of Camden =

This is a list of current and former Roman Catholic churches in the Roman Catholic Diocese of Camden. The diocese covers the counties of Atlantic, Camden, Cape May, Cumberland, Gloucester, and Salem in southern New Jersey.

== Camden ==
Name	Image	Location	Description/Notes
Cathedral of the Immaculate Conception		642 Market St, Camden	Listed on the National Register of Historic Places (NRHP)
St. Bartholomew		751 Kaighn Ave, Camden	
St. Joseph's Polish		1010 Liberty St, Camden	Listed on the NRHP
St. Joseph Pro-Cathedral		2907 Federal St, Camden	

== Atlantic City ==
Name	Image	Location	Description/Notes
Our Lady Star of the Sea		2651 Atlantic Ave, Atlantic City	
St. Michael		10 N Mississippi Ave, Atlantic City	
St. Monica		2651 Atlantic Ave, Atlantic City	
St. Nicholas of Tolentine		1409 Pacific Ave, Atlantic City	Listed on the NRHP

== Other areas ==
Name	Image	Location	Description/Notes
St. Elizabeth Ann Seton		591 New Jersey Ave, Absecon	
Our Lady Star of the Sea		525 Washington St, Cape May	
St. Agnes		501 Cape Ave, Cape May	
St. Anthony of Padua		267 Trenton Rd, Hammonton	
St. Mary		253 Old Dutch Mill Rd, Malaga	
St. Vincent de Paul		5021 Harding Hwy, Mays Landing	
