= James Louis Schad =

Catholic bishop (1917–2002)

Most Reverend James L. Schad
- Auxiliary bishop of Camden
- Church: Catholic Church
- See: Titular See of Panatoria
- Appointed: October 18, 1966
- In office: December 8, 1966 - January 26, 1993

Orders
- Ordination: April 10, 1943
- Consecration: December 8, 1966 by Celestine Damiano

Personal details
- Born: July 20, 1917 Philadelphia, Pennsylvania
- Died: March 27, 2002 (aged 84) Camden, New Jersey

James Louis Schad (July 20, 1917 – March 27, 2002) was a bishop of the Catholic Church in the United States. He served as an auxiliary bishop of the Diocese of Camden from 1966 to 1993.

== Biography ==
Born in Philadelphia, Pennsylvania, James Schad grew up in Vineland, New Jersey where he graduated from Sacred Heart High School. He studied for the priesthood at St. Mary's Seminary in Baltimore and was ordained a priest on April 10, 1943, for the Diocese of Camden.

His pastoral assignments as a priest and bishop included St. Rose of Lima parish in Haddon Heights, St. Anne's parish in Westville, Most Holy Redeemer parish in Westville Grove, Maris Stella parish in Avalon and the Cathedral of the Immaculate Conception in Camden.

On October 18, 1966 Pope Paul VI appointed Schad as the Titular bishop of Panatoria and Auxiliary Bishop of Camden. He was consecrated by Archbishop Celestine Damiano of Camden on December 8, 1966. The principal co-consecrators were Bishop James Hogan of Altoona-Johnstown and Auxiliary Bishop Pius Benincasa of Buffalo.

Schad served as auxiliary bishop until his resignation was accepted by Pope John Paul II on January 26, 1993.

He died of renal failure at Our Lady of Lourdes Medical Center in Camden on March 27, 2002, at the age of 84. He was buried at Sacred Heart Cemetery in Vineland, New Jersey.

Catholic Church titles
Preceded by –	Auxiliary Bishop of Camden; 1966–1993	Succeeded by –
