= Justin J. McCarthy =

Catholic bishop (1900–1959)

His Excellency, The Most Reverend Justin Joseph McCarthy
- Bishop of Camden
- See: Diocese of Camden
- In office: 1957–1959
- Predecessor: Bartholomew J. Eustace
- Successor: Celestine Damiano
- Previous post: Auxiliary Bishop of Newark 1954 to 1957

Orders
- Ordination: April 16, 1927 by Basilio Pompilj
- Consecration: June 11, 1955 by Thomas Aloysius Boland

Personal details
- Born: November 26, 1900 Sayre, Pennsylvania, US
- Died: December 26, 1959 (aged 59) Elizabeth, New Jersey, U.S.
- Buried: Calvary Cemetery, Cherry Hill, New Jersey, U.S.
- Denomination: Roman Catholic
- Education: St. Mary of the Assumption School; Seton Hall University; Pontifical Urban University
- Motto: Auspice Maria advocata nostra (Look upon Mary, our advocate)

Justin Joseph McCarthy (November 26, 1900 – December 26, 1959) was an American prelate of the Roman Catholic Church. McCarthy served as bishop of the Diocese of Camden in New Jersey from 1957 until his death in 1959. He previously served as an auxiliary bishop of the Archdiocese of Newark from 1954 to 1957

== Biography ==
=== Early life ===
Justin McCarthy was born on November 26, 1900, in Sayre, Pennsylvania, to Joseph and Delia (née Regan) McCarthy. He and his family later moved to Elizabeth, New Jersey, where he attended St. Mary of the Assumption School and Battin High School. He studied at Seton Hall University in South Orange, New Jersey, receiving a Bachelor of Arts degree (1923) and a Master of Arts degree (1925). McCarthy then furthered his studies in Rome, residing at the Pontifical North American College while studying theology at the Urban College of Propaganda.

=== Priesthood ===
While in Rome, McCarthy was ordained to the priesthood for the Archdiocese of Newark in Rome by Cardinal Basilio Pompilj on April 16, 1927. He earned his Licentiate of Sacred Theology from the Urban College that year as well.

Upon his return to New Jersey in 1927, the archdiocese assigned McCarthy as professor of sacred scripture and homiletics at Immaculate Conception Seminary at Seton Hall University. In 1941, he was named as spiritual director and professor of ascetical theology. The Vatican raised McCarthy to the rank of a papal chamberlain in 1941 and a domestic prelate in 1949. In 1953, he was named pastor of Our Lady of Sorrows Parish in South Orange. He also served as director of the Priests' Eucharistic League and the Confraternity of Christian Doctrine (CCD) for the archdiocese.

=== Auxiliary Bishop of Newark ===
On March 27, 1954, McCarthy was appointed as an auxiliary bishop of Newark and titular bishop of Doberus by Pope Pius XII. He received his episcopal consecration on June 11, 1954, from Archbishop Thomas Boland, with Bishops Bartholomew J. Eustace and James A. McNulty serving as co-consecrators, at the Cathedral of the Sacred Heart in Newark.

=== Bishop of Camden ===
Following the death of Eustace in December 1956, McCarthy was named the second bishop of Camden by Pius XII on January 27, 1957. He was installed at the Cathedral of the Immaculate Conception in Camden on March 19, 1957. On March 22, 1957, McCarthy suffered a heart attack and was admitted to Our Lady of Lourdes Hospital in Camden.

During his relatively short tenure, McCarthy made Catholic education his primary concern. He opened several new schools and expanded already existing ones, making room for an increase of over 5,000 students at the elementary level and 1,000 students at the high school level. At the time of his death, some 20,000 children were enrolled in CCD classes, nearly a 100 percent increase since his installation. McCarthy sent some clergy to Puerto Rico to learn Spanish so they could better serve Spanish-speaking Catholics. In 1957, he opened a mobile chapel for migrant workers, and in 1959 secured the services of four Oblates of the Sacred Heart Sisters to teach religion and do social work at Our Lady of Fatima Parish in Camden. He also erected four new parishes, founded a diocesan commission on properties and buildings, and encouraged a Catholic Youth Council be established at every parish in the diocese.

On December 26, 1959, McCarthy suffered a second heart attack while preparing to celebrate mass. He died later that day at St. Elizabeth's Hospital in Elizabeth, New Jersey. He is buried at Calvary Cemetery in Cherry Hill, New Jersey.

Catholic Church titles
Preceded by Bartholomew J. Eustace	Bishop of Camden; 1957–1959	Succeeded by Celestine Damiano
Preceded by –	Auxiliary Bishop of Newark, New Jersey; 1954–1957	Succeeded by –
