= Dennis Joseph Sullivan =

American prelate (born 1945)

His Excellency, The Most Reverend Dennis Joseph Sullivan
- Bishop Emeritus of Camden
- Church: Roman Catholic Church
- Diocese: Camden
- Appointed: January 8, 2013
- Installed: February 12, 2013
- Retired: March 17, 2025
- Predecessor: Joseph Anthony Galante
- Successor: Joseph A. Williams
- Previous post: Auxiliary Bishop of New York and Titular Bishop of Enera (2004-2013)

Orders
- Ordination: May 29, 1971 by Terence Cooke
- Consecration: September 21, 2004 by Edward Egan, Robert Anthony Brucato, and Patrick Sheridan

Personal details
- Born: March 17, 1945 (age 81) New York, New York, US
- Motto: In the breaking of the bread

Styles of Dennis Joseph Sullivan
- Reference style: His Excellency; The Most Reverend
- Spoken style: Your Excellency
- Religious style: Bishop

Dennis Joseph Sullivan (born March 17, 1945) is an American prelate of the Roman Catholic Church who was bishop of the Diocese of Camden in New Jersey from 2013 to 2025. He was vicar general and auxiliary bishop of the Archdiocese of New York from 2004 to 2013.

== Biography ==
=== Early life ===
Dennis Sullivan was born on March 17, 1945, in the Bronx, New York, to John and Hanorah (née Hayes) Sullivan. He has two brothers, Jack and Charlie, and one sister, Catherine.

Dennis Sullivan attended Mount St. Michael Academy in the Bronx before entering Iona College in New Rochelle, New York. Having decided to become a priest, he left Iona in his second year. Sullivan then entered St. Joseph's Seminary in Yonkers, New York; he earned a Bachelor of Arts in 1967. Sullivan went to Ponce, Puerto Rico, in 1969 to attend the Summer Spanish Language Institute at the Pontifical Catholic University of Puerto Rico. He was awarded a Master of Divinity degree in 1970 from St. Joseph's.

=== Priesthood ===
Sullivan was ordained to the priesthood for the Archdiocese of New York at St. Patrick's Cathedral in Manhattan by Cardinal Terence Cooke on May 29, 1971. The archdiocese then sent him to the Dominican Republic to further his study of Spanish. He spent three months there, where he "learned to speak Spanish very fast because nobody spoke English."

After Sullivan returned to New York City in 1971, the archdiocese assigned him as curate at the following parishes in New York City:

- St. Elizabeth's Parish in Washington Heights (1971 to 1976)
- SS Philip and James Parish in the Bronx (1976 to 1981)
- Ascension Parish in Manhattan (1981 to 1982)

Sullivan was named pastor of St. Teresa's Parish on the Lower East Side of Manhattan in 1981, where he gained a degree of fluency in Chinese. In 1999, Pope John Paul II elevated him to the rank of prelate of honor. In 2004, Sullivan became pastor of SS John and Paul Parish in Larchmont.

Sullivan also served as a member of the Lower East Side Catholic Area Conference, the archdiocesan priests' council, and the archdiocesan review board for sexual abuse cases.

=== Auxiliary Bishop of New York ===
On June 28, 2004, Sullivan was appointed an auxiliary bishop of New York and titular bishop of Enera by Pope John Paul II. He received his episcopal consecration on September 21, 2004, from Cardinal Edward Egan, with Bishops Robert Brucato and Patrick Sheridan serving as co-consecrators. Sullivan selected as his episcopal motto: "In the Breaking of the Bread".

As an auxiliary bishop, Sullivan served as the vicar general for the archdiocese. He celebrated the funeral mass of the writer Reverend Richard Neuhaus in January 2009. Within the United States Conference of Catholic Bishops, Sullivan is a member of the Subcommittee on Asian and Pacific Island Affairs and sat on the Catholic Campaign for Human Development Committee from 2005 to 2008.

=== Bishop of Camden ===
On January 8, 2013, Pope Benedict XVI appointed Sullivan bishop of Camden. In January 2014, Sullivan was criticized after the archdiocese purchased a mansion for approximately $500,000 in Woodbury, New Jersey, from Rowan University to serve as the bishop's residence. The diocese responded that the bishop needed the extra room for meetings and conferences.

In October 2020, Sullivan announced that the diocese was filing for Chapter 11 bankruptcy protection. He cited the financial effects of the COVID-19 pandemic and sexual abuse lawsuit settlements as the causes. He submitted his age-mandated retirement request the same year when he turned 75.

In 2023, Sullivan was part of the team appointed by Pope Francis to investigate Bishop Joseph Strickland of the Diocese of Tyler in Texas after Strickland criticized the pope. Francis removed Strickland as bishop of Tyler on November 11, 2023.

=== Retirement ===
Bishop Joseph A. Williams was named Sullivan's coadjutor in March 2024 and Pope Francis accepted Sullivan's resignation as bishop of Camden on March 17, 2025, his 80th birthday.

Catholic Church titles
Preceded by Joseph Anthony Galante	Bishop of Camden; 2013–2025	Succeeded by Joseph A. Williams
Preceded by –	Auxiliary Bishop of New York; 2004–2013	Succeeded by –
