= Bishop Eustace =

Bishop Eustace may refer to:

- Eustace (bishop of Ely) (died 1215), Lord Chancellor of England, Dean of Salisbury and Bishop of Ely
- Eustace of Fauconberg (died 1228), Bishop of London and Lord High Treasurer
- Bartholomew J. Eustace (1887–1956), American Roman Catholic prelate and Bishop of Camden
  - Eustace Preparatory School, a Catholic high school in Pennsauken Township, New Jersey
