= Celestine Damiano =

American prelate

His Excellency, The Most Reverend Celestine Damiano
- Archbishop (personal title); Bishop of Camden titular archbishop of Nicopolis
- See: Diocese of Camden
- Appointed: November 27, 1952
- Installed: May 3, 1960
- Term ended: October 2, 1967
- Predecessor: Justin J. McCarthy
- Successor: George H. Guilfoyle
- Other post: Apostolic Delegate to South Africa (1953–1960)

Orders
- Ordination: December 21, 1935 by Giuseppe Palica
- Consecration: February 11, 1953 by Joseph A. Burke

Personal details
- Born: November 1, 1911 Dunkirk, New York, US
- Died: October 2, 1967 (aged 55) Camden, New Jersey, US
- Buried: Calvary Cemetery, Cherry Hill, New Jersey, US
- Denomination: Roman Catholic
- Parents: Vito and Stella (née Zaccari) Damiano
- Education: St. Michael's College; Urban College of the Propaganda
- Motto: Fortis in fide (Strong in faith)
- Coat of arms

Celestine Joseph Damiano (November 1, 1911 – October 2, 1967) was an American Catholic prelate who served as Bishop of Camden from 1960 to 1967. He previously served as apostolic delegate to South Africa (1953–1960).

== Biography ==
=== Early life ===
The oldest of six children, Celestine Damiano was born on November 1, 1911, in Dunkirk, New York, to Vito and Stella (née Zaccari) Damiano, both Italian immigrants. Receiving his early education at public schools in Dunkirk, he studied at St. Michael's College in Toronto, Ontario, for two years. Damiano then entered the Urban College of the Propaganda in Rome, where he studied philosophy and theology.

=== Priesthood ===
Damiano was ordained to the priesthood in Rome for the Diocese of Buffalo on December 21, 1935, by Archbishop Giuseppe Palica. After Damiano returned to Buffalo, the diocese assigned him to pastoral postings at parishes in Buffalo and Niagara Falls, New York. In 1947, he went back to Rome to serve as an official of the Congregation for the Propagation of the Faith.

=== Apostolic delegate to South Africa ===
On November 27, 1952, Damiano was appointed apostolic delegate to South Africa and titular archbishop of Nicopolis in Epiro by Pope Pius XII. He received his episcopal consecration on February 11, 1953, from Bishop Joseph A. Burke, with Archbishop John O'Hara and Bishop Leo Smith serving as co-consecrators, at Saint Joseph's Cathedral in Buffalo.

While in South Africa, Damiano was highly influential in changing the face of the local church in South Africa, becoming a vocal opponent of the South African Government's apartheid policies.

=== Archbishop of Camden ===
Following the death of Bishop Justin J. McCarthy in December 1959, Pope John XXIII appointed Damiano as the third bishop of Camden (with the personal title of archbishop) on January 24, 1960. He was installed at the Cathedral of the Immaculate Conception in Camden on May 3, 1960.

==== Schools ====
In September 1960, Damiano launched a drive to raise $5 million for the construction and improvement of Catholic secondary schools in the diocese. He established the following high schools in New Jersey:

- Camden Catholic High School in Cherry Hill
- Holy Spirit High School in Absecon
- Paul VI High School in Haddonfield

Damiano also opened 17 new elementary schools in the diocese, with total enrollment for all schools increasing by more than 3,000. He also founded a diocesan school board in 1965, and greatly expanded the Confraternity of Christian Doctrine program for children.

==== Social welfare ====
Concerned with the welfare of the 25,000 Catholic Puerto Ricans living in his diocese, Damiano established the Spanish Catholic Center at Vineland in 1962. Damiano initiated the diocese's Brazil mission project in 1961, and the House of Charity Appeal for funding diocesan human services in 1964. He was a member of the Central Preparatory Commission in Rome and attended all four sessions of the Second Vatican Council there (1962–1965). He delivered the invocation for the 1964 Democratic National Convention in Atlantic City, New Jersey.

In 1966, Damiano established a new rule to allow interracial weddings in diocesan churches without permission from the diocese. Previously, these couples were married only in church rectories.

== Death ==
On October 2, 1967, while recuperating from gall bladder surgery, Damiano died at age 55 from a thrombus at Our Lady of Lourdes Hospital in Camden.

Catholic Church titles
| Preceded by Martin Lucas, S.V.D. | Apostolic Delegate to South Africa; 1952–1960 | Succeeded by Joseph Francis McGeough |
| Preceded by Justin J. McCarthy | Bishop of Camden; 1960–1967 | Succeeded by George H. Guilfoyle |
