= George Henry Guilfoyle =

Catholic bishop

His Excellency, The Most Reverend George Henry Guilfoyle
- Bishop of Camden; Titular Bishop of Marazanae
- See: Diocese of Camden
- In office: 1968–1989
- Predecessor: Celestine Damiano
- Successor: James T. McHugh

Orders
- Ordination: March 25, 1944 by Francis Spellman
- Consecration: November 30, 1964 by Francis Spellman

Personal details
- Born: November 13, 1913 New York City, US
- Died: June 11, 1991 (aged 79) Camden, New Jersey, US
- Denomination: Roman Catholic
- Parents: James J. and Johanna (née McGrath) Guilfoyle
- Education: Georgetown University; Fordham University; St. Joseph's Seminary; Columbia University
- Motto: Caritas lex suprema (Charity is the supreme goal)

Ordination history of George Henry Guilfoyle
History
Episcopal consecration
- Consecrated by: Francis Spellman (New York)
Episcopal succession
Bishops consecrated by George Henry Guilfoyle as principal consecrator
- Miguel Pedro Mundo: June 2, 1978

George Henry Guilfoyle (November 13, 1913 – June 11, 1991) was an American prelate of the Roman Catholic Church. He served as bishop of the Diocese of Camden in New Jersey from 1968 to 1989. He previously served as an auxiliary bishop of the Archdiocese of New York from 1964 to 1968.

== Biography ==
=== Early life ===
The second oldest of five children, George Guilfoyle was born on November 13, 1913, in New York City to James J. and Johanna (née McGrath) Guilfoyle. After graduating from Regis High School in New York City in 1931, he studied at Georgetown University in Washington, D.C., earning a Bachelor of Arts degree in 1935. At Georgetown, Guilfoyle was president of the student body and a member of the Philodemic Debating Society.

In 1939, Guilfoyle received a Bachelor of Laws degree from Fordham University in the Bronx and was later admitted to the New York Bar. However, deciding to become a priest, he soon abandoned his legal career and entered St. Joseph's Seminary in Yonkers, New York.

=== Priesthood ===
Guilfoyle was ordained to the priesthood for the Archdiocese of New York by Cardinal Francis Spellman on March 25, 1944. He earned a Master of Laws degree from Columbia University in Manhattan that same year.

After his ordination, the archdiocese assigned Guilfoyle as a curate at St. Patrick's Cathedral in Manhattan until 1945, when he was transferred to St. Andrew's Parish in Manhattan. He served as assistant chancellor of the archdiocese from 1946 to 1947, and was named director of social research in 1947, assistant executive director in 1954 and executive director in 1956 of Catholic Charities. During his tenure at Catholic Charities, Guilfoyle directed 199 separate institutions and agencies. The Vatican raised him to the rank of a papal chamberlain in 1955 and a domestic prelate in 1957.

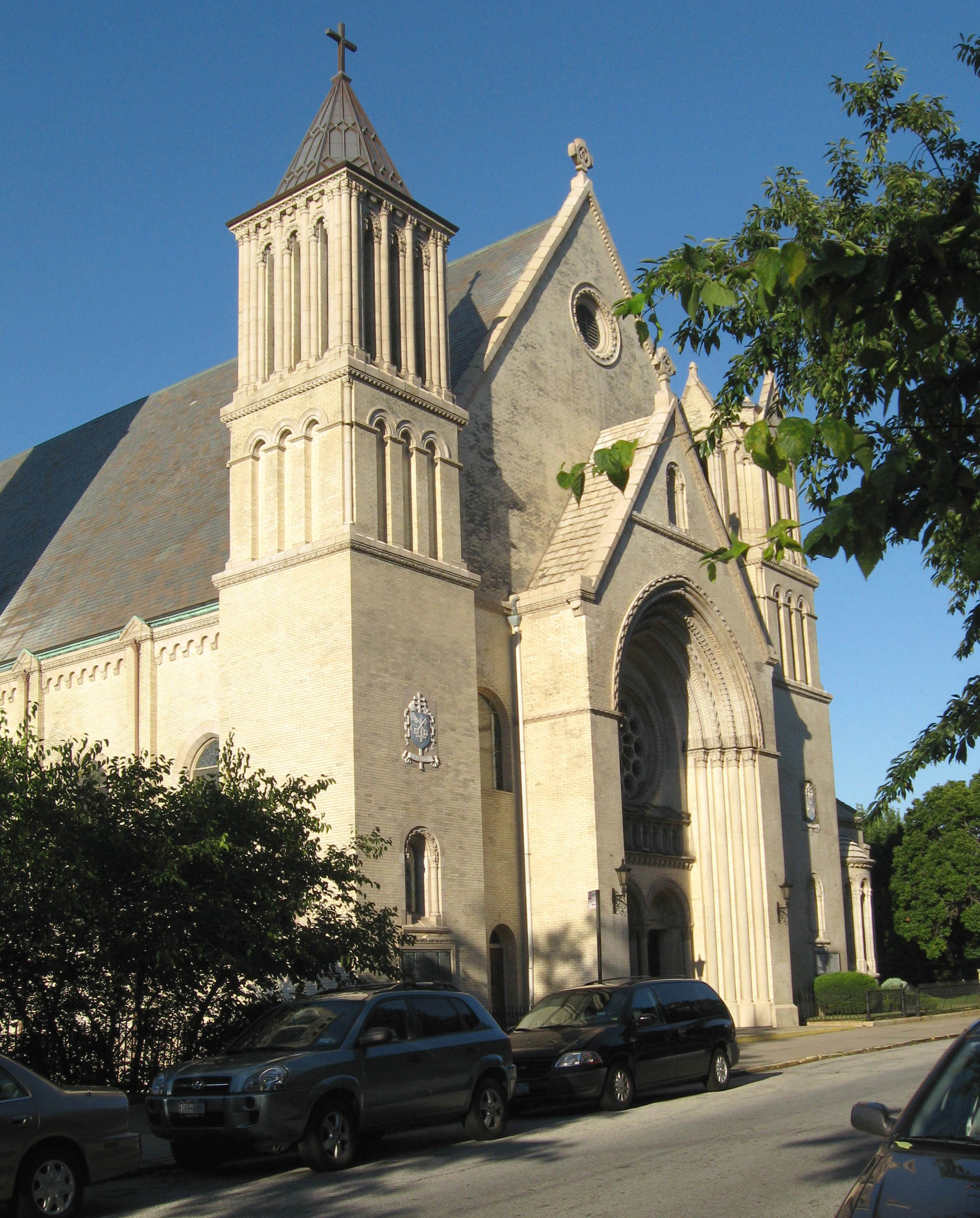
St. Peter's Church, Staten Island, New York (2008)

=== Auxiliary Bishop of New York ===
On October 17, 1964, Guilfoyle was appointed as an auxiliary bishop of New York and titular bishop of Marazanae by Pope Paul VI. He received his episcopal consecration on November 30, 1964, from Spellman, with Bishops Christopher Weldon and John Maguire serving as co-consecrators, at St. Patrick's Cathedral. He remained executive director of Catholic Charities until 1966, when he became episcopal vicar of Staten Island and pastor of St. Peter's Parish.

=== Bishop of Camden ===
Guilfoyle was named the fourth bishop of Camden by Paul VI on January 2, 1968. Guilfoyle was installed at Cathedral of the Immaculate Conception in Camden on March 4, 1968.

Following the assassination of Dr. Martin Luther King Jr. in April 1968, Guilfoyle described racism as "not a mere myth but an ugly reality" and urged Catholics to "purge every fragment of racism among us." He established a Diocesan Pastoral Council and directed every parish to establish a parish council in 1968. He also established the Office of Pastoral Planning, Office of Evangelization, and Secretariat for Education. He advocated "the right to life from conception to old age," and established the Pro-Life Office in 1973.

During his tenure, Guilfoyle erected eight parishes, 11 convents, 23 churches, 37 rectories, and six schools. A retreat house was acquired by the diocese, special education facilities were expanded and a Newman Centre erected at Glassboro State College in Glassboro, New Jersey. Nursing homes were constructed and acquired, as well as the establishment of two complexes for the elderly, Victorian Towers in Cape May, New Jersey, and St. Mary's Village. Evangelization in the Hispanic community, through religious service and social ministry, was accomplished through a newly established Hispanic Apostolate; Spanish-language masses in many South Jersey parishes were instituted, while the diocese worked to obtain Spanish-speaking priests and religious for pastoral work among Hispanics.

Guilfoyle served for many years on the Administrative Board of the National Conference of Catholic Bishops, holding membership on a number of its committees, including those on priestly life and ministry, conciliation and arbitration (on which he also served as chairman), bishops, diocesan boundaries, budget and finance, Latin America, ecumenical, and motion pictures. Within the Roman Curia, he was a member of the Congregation for the Causes of Saints from 1969 to 1975.

=== Retirement and legacy ===
On May 13, 1989, Pope John Paul II accepted Guilfoyle's resignation as bishop of Camden. He was hospitalized for a respiratory ailment in May 1991. George Guilfoyle died on June 11, 1991, at Our Lady of Lourdes Medical Center in Camden at age 77.

Bishop Guilfoyle Regional Catholic School in Carneys Point, New Jersey, was named in his honor.

Catholic Church titles
Preceded by Celestine Damiano	Bishop of Camden; 1968–1989	Succeeded by James T. McHugh
Preceded by –	Auxiliary Bishop of New York; 1964–1968	Succeeded by –
