= Sacred Heart High School (New Jersey) =

Defunct Catholic high school in Cape May County, New Jersey, US

Location
- 15 North East Avenue; Vineland, Cumberland, New Jersey 08360; United States; 39°29′10″N 75°0′59″W

Information
- Type: Private, Coeducational
- Religious affiliation: Roman Catholic
- Established: 1927
- Closed: 2013
- President: Fr. Edward Namiotka
- Principal: Diane Tucker
- Faculty: 23.8 (on FTE basis)
- Grades: 9–12
- Student to teacher ratio: 12.1:1
- Colors: Red and Blue
- Athletics conference: Cape-Atlantic League
- Team name: Lions
- Accreditation: Middle States Association of Colleges and Schools
- Newspaper: Visions
- Yearbook: Vine Leaves
- School fees: $500 (2010-11)
- Tuition: $7,950 (2010-11)
- Athletic director: Keith Jones
- Website: www.shhslions.com

Sacred Heart High School was a co-educational four-year Catholic high school in Vineland, in Cumberland County, in the U.S. state of New Jersey. It operated under the auspices of the Roman Catholic Diocese of Camden. The school had been accredited by the Middle States Association of Colleges and Schools Commission on Elementary and Secondary Schools since 1963.

As of the 2009–10 school year, the school had an enrollment of 288 students and 23.8 faculty (on an FTE basis), resulting in a student–teacher ratio of 12.1:1.

== History ==
In 2012 the archdiocese announced plans to close the school, but it was given a reprieve. In the spring of that year the school, designed to accommodate an enrollment of 350, had 67 twelfth graders and a total of 202 students.

On April 12, 2013, it was announced that Sacred Heart High School would close at the end of the school year, on June 30. This announcement was made with no prior warning by Bishop Dennis J. Sullivan of the Camden Diocese. He maintained that his decision was final and gave no chance for the five-year plan that was established a year prior to take effect.

Post-closure St. Joseph High School in Hammonton was the closest remaining Catholic high school. That school closed in 2020, replaced by the private non-diocesan St. Joseph Academy.

== Athletics ==
The Sacred Heart High School Lions competed in the National Division of the Cape-Atlantic League, an athletic conference comprised of both public and private high schools in Atlantic, Cape May, Cumberland and Gloucester counties, operating under the aegis of the New Jersey State Interscholastic Athletic Association (NJSIAA).

The baseball team won the Non-Public Group C state championship in 1974 (defeating St. Mary High School of Rutherford in the playoff finals) and 1978 (vs. Immaculate Conception High School of Montclair), and won the Non-Public B title in 1999 (vs. Paterson Catholic High School) and 2000 (vs. St. Mary). The 1978 team won the Parochial C title with a 5-2 win against Immaculate Conception of Montclair in the championship game at Mercer County Park. The 2000 team finished the season with a record of 28-3 after winning the Parochial C title by defeating St. Mary of Rutherford by a score of 6-0 in the championship game.

The 1979 boys basketball team won the Non-Public Group C state title, defeating runner-up St. Anthony High School by a score of 75-68 in overtime in the championship game to finish the season with a 19-4 record.

The girls basketball team won the Non-Public Group B state title in 2003 (defeating Morris Catholic High School in the tournament final) and 2005 (vs. Morris Catholic). The team, coached by Steve DiPatri, won the 2001 Parochial South B state sectional championship with a 34–28 win against Gloucester Catholic High School. The 2001 team moved on to win the Group B state championship with a 65–53 win over Marist High School. In 2003, the team won the Parochial South B title again, capping off a 22-game winning streak that included defeating St. Rose High School 47–40 in the final game of the tournament. The team won the title again in 2005 over Holy Spirit High School. The 2005 team moved on to win the Group B state championship with a 74-37 drubbing of Morris Catholic High School.

In 2004, the girls' softball team won the Parochial South B state title over McCorristin Catholic High School with a 5–2 win in the tournament final.

The girls' tennis team won the 2006 Parochial South B title with a pair of 3-2 wins, over Bishop Eustace High School in the semifinals and over Moorestown Friends School in the tournament final.

The boys' Track and Field Team won the 2005, 2006, and 2007 South Jersey Non-Public B Title.

In 2008, the boys' soccer team won the Non-Public B state championship by defeating Gill St. Bernard's School by a score of 1–0, ending the season with a 19–2 record and marking the program's first state title.

In 2012, the softball team won its first and only state championship, defeating Immaculate Conception High School of Lodi by a score of 3–1 in the Non-Public B tournament final, completing the season with a 27–6 record.

== Notable alumni ==
- Nelson Albano (born 1954), politician who represented the 1st Legislative District in the New Jersey General Assembly from 2006 to 2014
- Grace Mary Flickinger (1935–2024, class of 1952), religious sister and college professor
- James Louis Schad (1917-2002), bishop of the Catholic Church in the United States. He served as an auxiliary bishop of the Diocese of Camden from 1966 to 1993
