= Expecting to Fly =

Expecting to Fly may refer to:

- "Expecting to Fly" (song), a song by Buffalo Springfield
- Expecting to Fly (album), an album by The Bluetones
- Expecting to Fly (Book), a book by Patrick Sheridan
- "Expecting to Fly", a song by the New Zealand band Headless Chickens, off their 1988 album Stunt Clown
