= Jubilate Deo Chorale and Orchestra =

The Jubilate Deo Chorale and Orchestra is a Roman Catholic musical group that attempts to use music to integrate spirituality into the mainstream of society. In 1991 the Camden New Jersey diocese granted permission for Msgrs. Carl and Louis Marucci, to create the group.

In the spring of 2001, the board of governors and members of the orchestra hired conductor Dr. Ron Matthews. The orchestra annually performs several sacred oratorios for an audience of 5,000-7,000 people. The group's repertoire ranges from ancient Gregorian chant to contemporary inspirational music.

A 75-member non-profit choir and a 75-member professional symphonic orchestra make up the group. The orchestra is the only group of its kind in New Jersey. The sharing of spirituality has been the key to the group's attractiveness and success.
