= James T. McHugh =

Catholic bishop

His Excellency, The Most Reverend James Thomas McHugh
- Bishop of Rockville Centre
- See: Diocese of Rockville Centre
- Appointed: December 7, 1998 (Coadjutor)
- Installed: January 4, 2000
- Term ended: December 10, 2000
- Predecessor: John R. McGann
- Successor: William Murphy
- Other posts: Auxiliary Bishop of Newark (1988–1989); Bishop of Camden (1989–1998); Coadjutor Bishop of Rockville Centre (1998–2000)

Orders
- Ordination: May 25, 1957 by Thomas Aloysius Boland
- Consecration: January 25, 1988 by Theodore McCarrick

Personal details
- Born: January 3, 1932 Orange, New Jersey, US
- Died: December 10, 2000 (aged 68) Rockville Centre, New York, US
- Denomination: Roman Catholic Church
- Education: Seton Hall University; Immaculate Conception Seminary; Fordham University; Catholic University of America; Pontifical University of St. Thomas Aquinas (Angelicum)
- Motto: Quid retribuam Domino (What shall I return to the Lord)
- Coat of arms

James Thomas McHugh (January 3, 1932 – December 10, 2000) was an American Catholic prelate who served as Bishop of Rockville Centre during the year 2000. He previously served as Coadjutor Bishop of Rockville Centre from 1998 to early 2000, as Bishop of Camden from 1989 to 1998 and as an auxiliary bishop for the Archdiocese of Newark from 1987 to 1989.

== Biography ==
=== Early life ===
McHugh was born on January 3, 1932, in Orange, New Jersey, to James T. and Caroline (née Scavone) McHugh. He received his early education at the parochial school of St. Venantius Parish, and attended Our Lady of the Valley High School, both in Orange. He enrolled at Seton Hall University in South Orange, New Jersey, earning a Bachelor of Arts degree in classical languages. McHugh then began his studies for the priesthood at Immaculate Conception Seminary in Darlington, New Jersey, receiving a Master of Divinity degree.

== Priesthood ==
On May 25, 1957, McHugh was ordained a priest of the Archdiocese of Newark at the Cathedral of the Sacred Heart in Newark, New Jersey by Archbishop Thomas Aloysius Boland. After his ordination, the archdiocese assigned McHugh as a curate at Our Lady of Mount Carmel Parish in Newark. He was later transferred to Holy Trinity Parish in Fort Lee, New Jersey. He served as a member of the Archdiocesan Family Life Committee from 1962 to 1965.

In addition to his pastoral duties, McHugh did graduate work in sociology at Fordham University in New York City from 1963 to 1965. He served as moderator of the Bergen County Catholic Physicians' Guild (1964–1965) and of the Bergen County Catholic Nurses' Council (1963–1965). He continued his studies in sociology at the Catholic University of America in Washington, D.C., from 1965 to 1967. In 1965, McHugh joined the staff of the National Conference of Catholic Bishops, where he served as director of the Family Life Bureau (1965–1975), director of the National Right to Life Committee (1967), and of the Office of Pro-Life Activities (1972–1978). While in that position he caused controversy when, in response to US President Richard Nixon's July 1969 proposal of federal funding of artificial contraception as a means of population control, McHugh said Nixon's message was "a positive and constructive approach to the problem." The Vatican named McHugh as a papal chamberlain in 1971 and as an honorary prelate in 1986.

McHugh was a visiting lecturer in theology at Princeton Theological Seminary (1974), Immaculate Conception Seminary (1976–81), and American College of Louvain in Belgium (1976). He became director of the Diocesan Development Program for Natural Family Planning in 1981. From 1978 to 1981, he studied moral theology with a concentration in medical ethics at the Pontifical University of St. Thomas Aquinas (Angelicum) in Rome where he earned a doctorate in theology. He then served as a visiting lecturer at the Pontifical Lateran University in 1982. He served as special assistant at the World Synod of Bishops on "The Christian Family in the Contemporary World" in 1980, and was appointed to the delegation of the Permanent Observer Mission of the Holy See to the United Nations in 1983. He was appointed archdiocesan vicar for Parish and Family Life in 1986.

=== Auxiliary Bishop of Newark ===
On November 20, 1987, McHugh was appointed as an auxiliary bishop of Newark and titular bishop of Morosbisdus by Pope John Paul II. He received his episcopal consecration on January 25, 1988, from Archbishop Theodore Edgar McCarrick, with Archbishop Peter Leo Gerety and Bishop Walter William Curtis serving as co-consecrators, at the Cathedral of the Sacred Heart. He selected as his episcopal motto: Quid retribuam Domino, meaning, "What shall I return to the Lord" (Psalms 116:12).

=== Bishop of Camden ===
Coat of arms as bishop of Camden

Following the retirement of Bishop George Guilfoyle, McHugh was named the fifth bishop of Camden on May 13, 1989, by John Paul II. His installation took place at the Cathedral of the Immaculate Conception on June 20, 1989. During his nine-year tenure, he undertook a major reorganization of the diocese's administrative structure and authorized the relocation of the diocesan headquarters to downtown Camden. He presided over a diocesan synod in September 1992. McHugh created a $63 million Catholic Education Endowment Fund for schools and religious education programs, a five-point plan to reinvigorate Catholic high schools, and led a campaign to support legislation for school vouchers in the New Jersey State Legislature.

McHugh served as a delegate at United Nations-sponsored conferences on the environment (1992 in Rio de Janeiro) and on population and development (1994 in Cairo).

=== Coadjutor Bishop and Bishop of Rockville Centre ===
McHugh was appointed coadjutor bishop of Rockville Centre by John Paul II on December 7, 1998, effective February 22, 1999. He succeeded to the office of diocesan bishop by right of succession on January 4, 2000.

=== Death ===
McHugh died of liver and gallbladder cancer on December 10, 2000, in Rockville Centre, New York, at age 68.

== McCarrick cover-up ==
In November 2020, a Vatican investigation into the case of defrocked former cardinal Theodore McCarrick identified McHugh as one of three bishops who "provided inaccurate and incomplete information to the Holy See regarding McCarrick’s sexual conduct with young adults" when McCarrick was a candidate for Archbishop of Washington in 2000.

Catholic Church titles
| Preceded by John R. McGann | Bishop of Rockville Centre; 2000–2000 | Succeeded by William F. Murphy |
| Preceded by George H. Guilfoyle | Bishop of Camden; 1989–1998 | Succeeded by Nicholas Anthony DiMarzio |
| Preceded by – | Auxiliary Bishop of Newark, New Jersey; 1987–1989 | Succeeded by – |
