= St. Joseph Pro-Cathedral (Camden, New Jersey) =

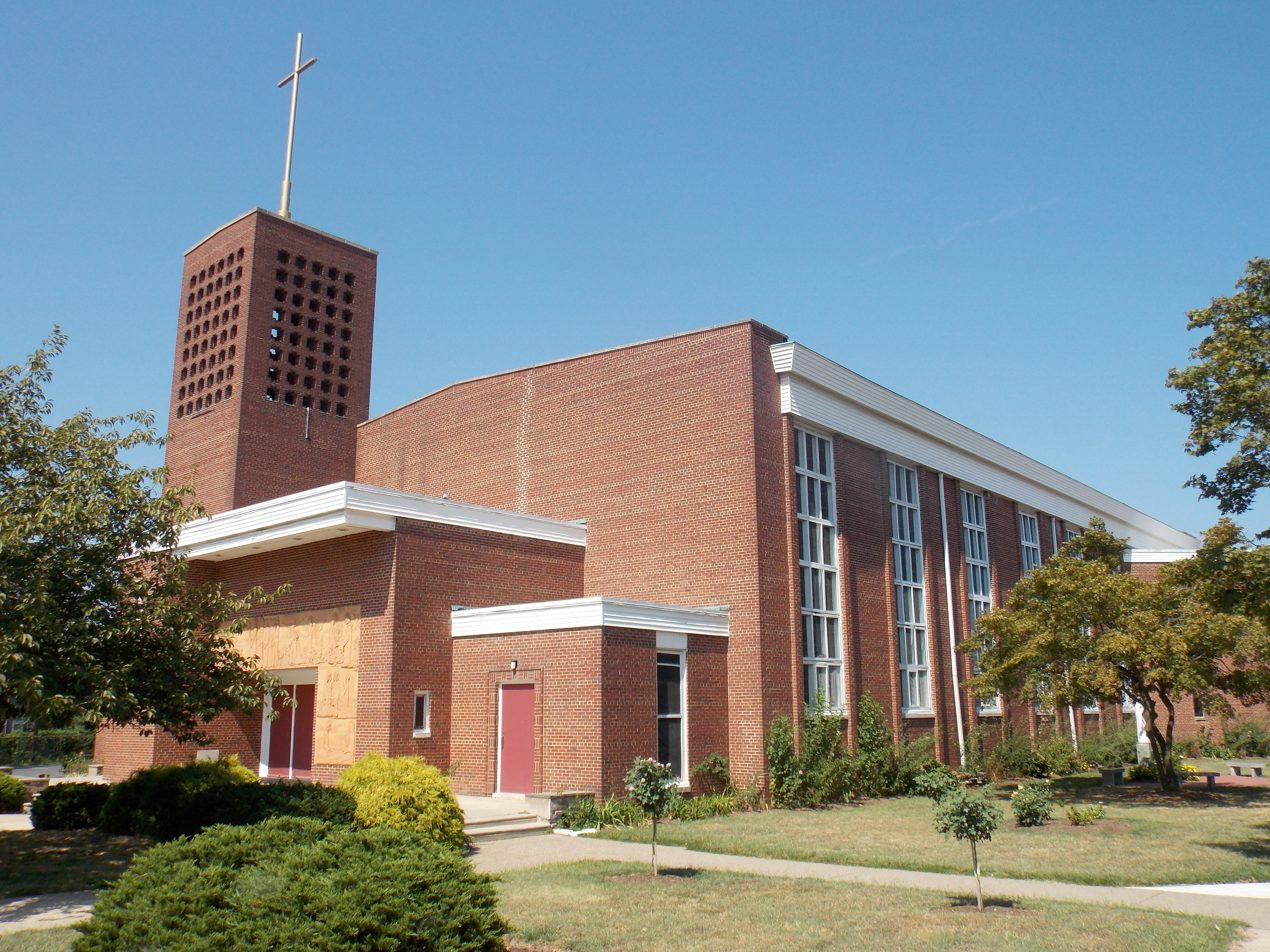

- Location in Camden County, New Jersey
- 39°56′50″N 75°05′02″W
- Location: 2907 Federal St. Camden, New Jersey
- Country: United States
- Denomination: Roman Catholic Church
- Website: www.sjprocathedral.org

History
- Status: Parish
- Founded: 1893

Architecture
- Architectural type: Brick
- Style: Modern
- Completed: 1952

Specifications
- Materials: Brick

Administration
- Diocese: Camden

Clergy
- Bishop: Most Rev. Joseph A. Williams
- Pastor: Rev. Jaime Hostios

St. Joseph Pro-Cathedral is a Catholic parish located on the east side of Camden, New Jersey, United States. It serves as the pro-cathedral of the Diocese of Camden. It is one of two parishes in the city of Camden to be named St. Joseph. The other one is St. Joseph Polish Catholic Church, which was established in 1891.

== History ==
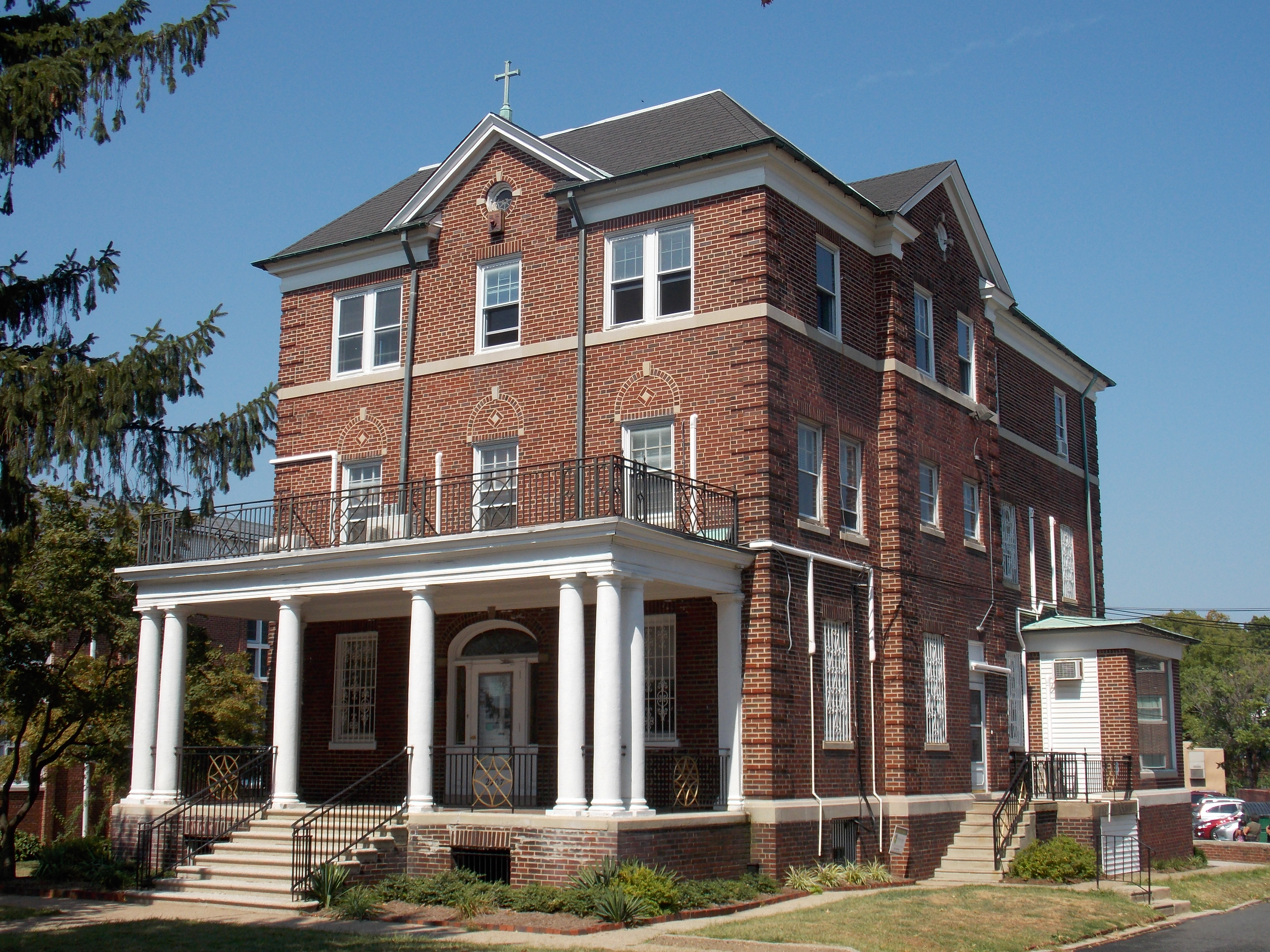
Rectory

The parish began as a mission station in the early 1890s and was served by the Franciscans from Sts. Peter and Paul Church. The mission was started in what was known as the Boyce residence on Cooper Street, now 27th Street, in the town of Stockton. The first Mass was celebrated on February 7, 1892 in Wright’s Hall on Marlton Pike, near Federal Street. The parish itself was established the following year. The resolution to build a new church was passed on April 20, 1893 and John D’Arcy of Camden was chosen as the architect. It was built on the corner of North 25th and Howell Streets and was dedicated on December 16, 1893. The Rev. Alphonse Lehrscholl was assigned to be the first pastor. The church was damaged in a fire in October 1915 and was repaired. The building was abandoned in 1929 when the present school building was erected on Westfield Avenue, and it was torn down ten years later after it was declared a fire hazard.

The present church was built in the Modern architectural style in 1952. The property had been the site of St. Patrick’s Cemetery. It was declared a pro-cathedral as the main cathedral downtown, the Cathedral of the Immaculate Conception, is rather small in size.

On March 24, 1998 Romero Center Ministries was founded in the former convent. The founding date was the 18th anniversary of the assassination of El Salvador’s Archbishop Óscar Romero. It serves as an urban retreat center that focuses on service to the poor.

Bishop Joseph Galante announced on April 4, 2008 that St. Joseph Pro-Cathedral would merge with St. Cecilia Parish in Pennsauken and St. Veronica Parish in Delair. St. Joseph's would have been the main worship site. However, the proposed merger did not take place and Saint Joseph Pro-Cathedral remained a "stand alone" parish.

== Gallery ==
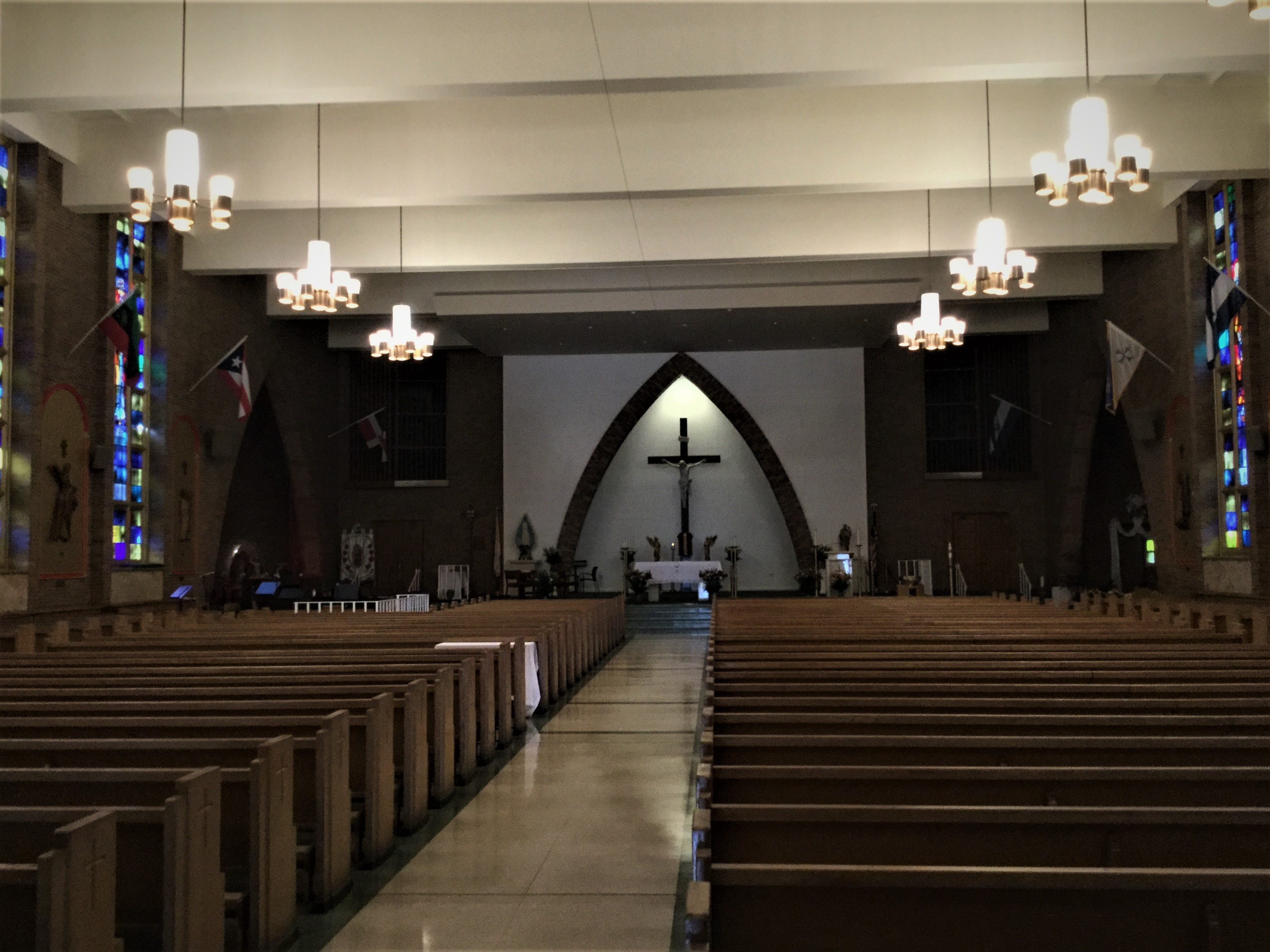
Interior of St. Joseph Pro-Cathedral

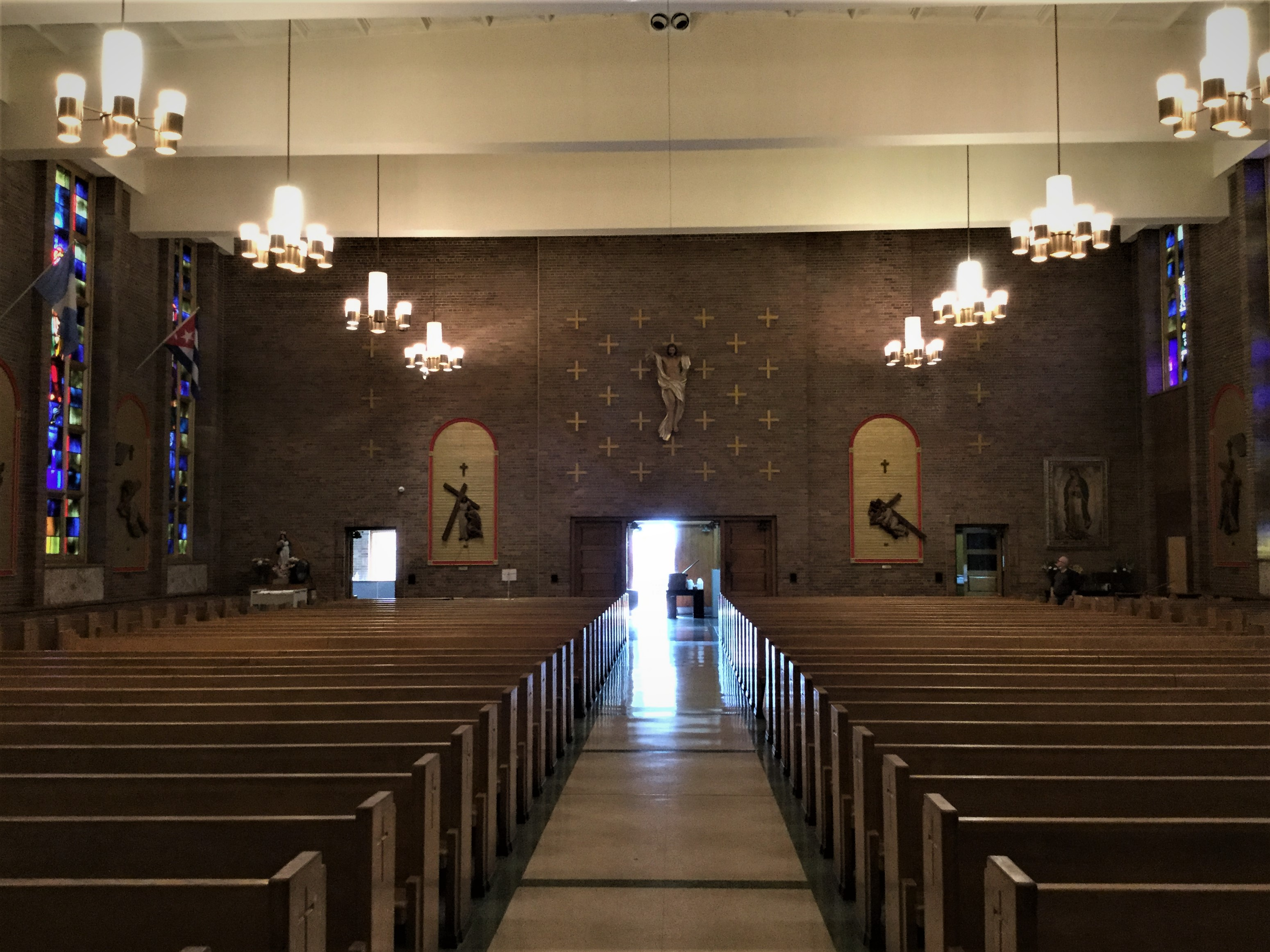
Rear of St. Joseph Pro-Cathedral

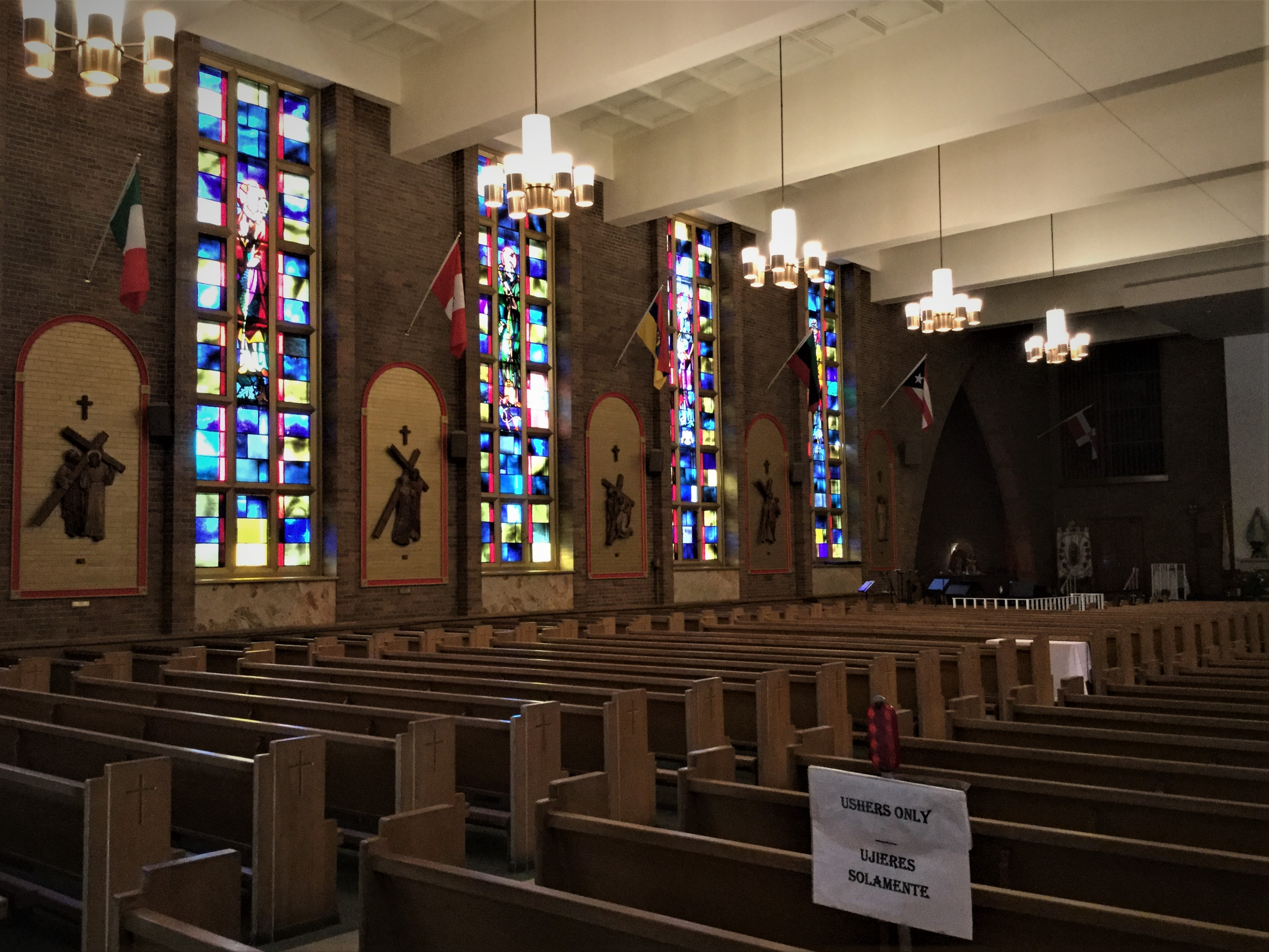
Stained glass on the left side of St. Joseph Pro-Cathedral

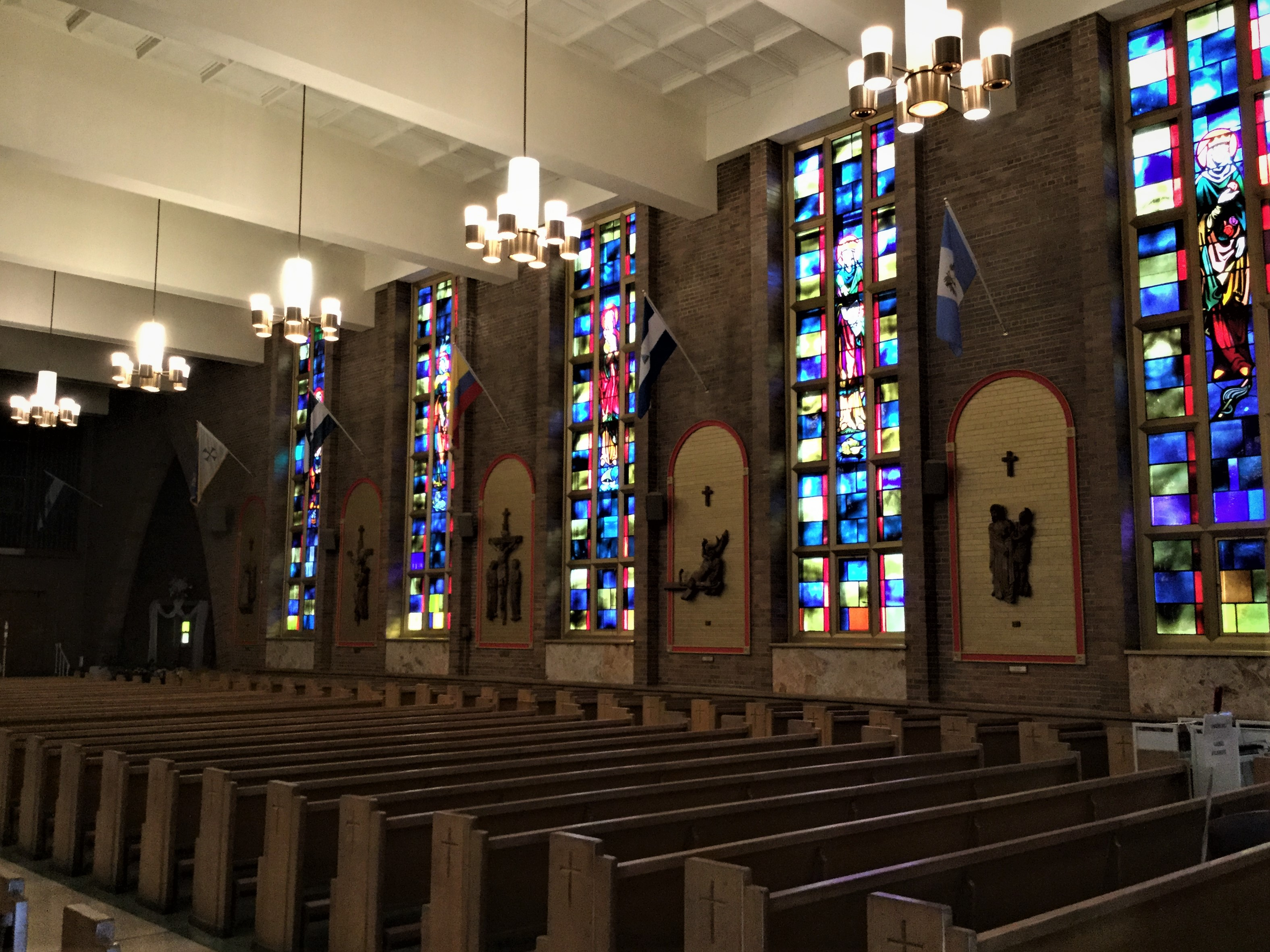
Stained glass on the right side of St. Joseph Pro-Cathedral

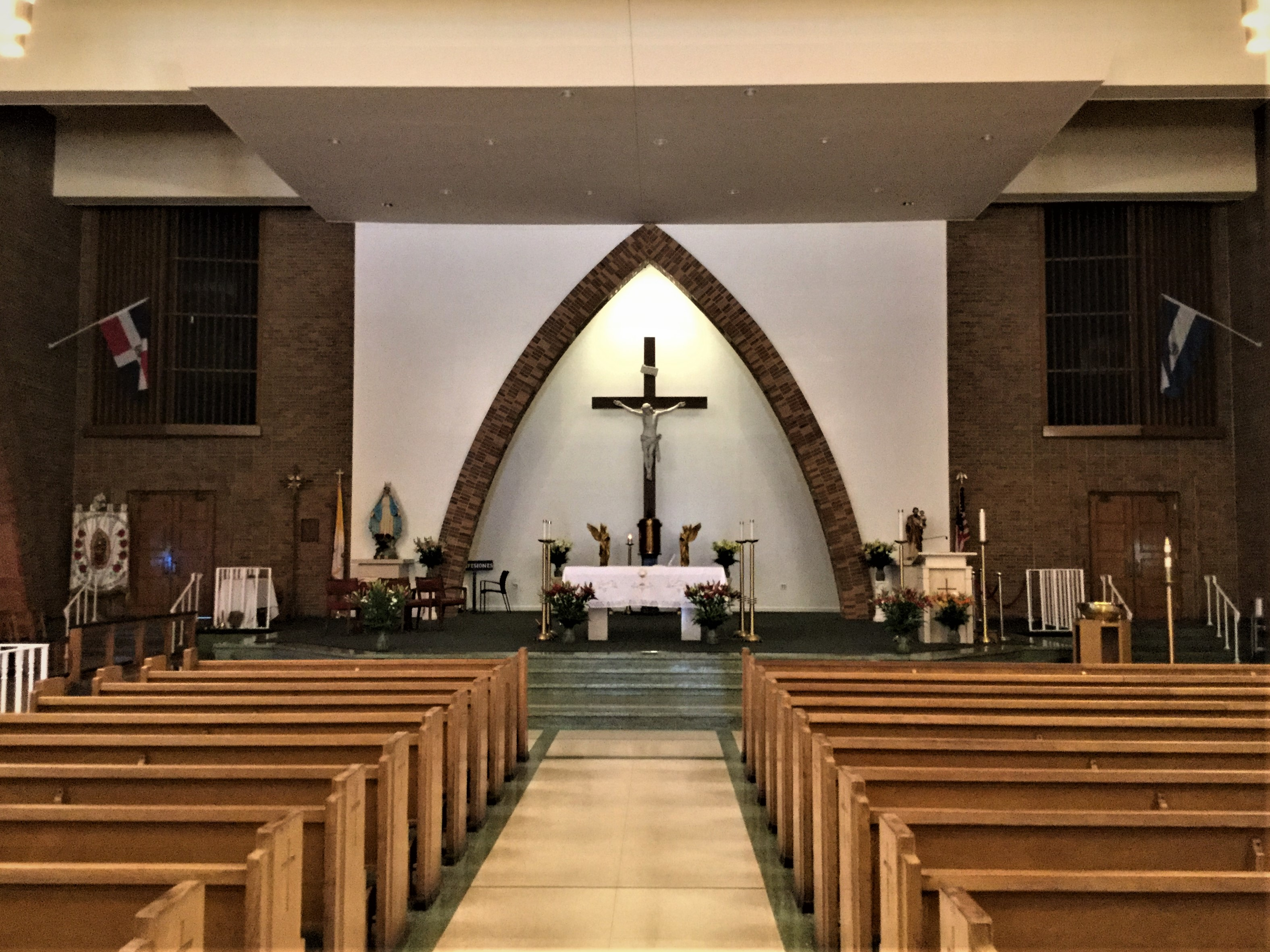
Closeup of the altar

== See also ==
- List of Catholic cathedrals in the United States
- List of cathedrals in the United States
