= James J. Norris =

American advocate for refugees and displaced people

- Born: August 10, 1907; Roselle Park, New Jersey
- Died: November 17, 1976; Saint Michael’s Hospital, Newark, New Jersey
- Citizenship: United States
- Education: Battin High School, Elizabeth, New Jersey; St. Joseph's Preparatory Seminary, Holy Trinity, Alabama
- Alma mater: Catholic University of America (BA)
- Organization(s): International Catholic Migration Commission; Catholic Relief Services
- Known for: Advocate for Migrants and Refugees
- Awards: Nansen Refugee Award (1975) (UNHCR) James Cardinal Gibbons Medal (1967); Order of the House of Orange, Officer (January 14, 1964); Order of Isabella the Catholic, Knight's Cross (March 20, 1957); Order of the Phoenix (Greece), 2nd Class, Grand Commander (1955); Medal of the Hellenic Red Cross (Greece) (January 3, 1958); Order of Merit of the Federal Republic of Germany, Commander Cross of the Order (September 12, 1953); Order of Polonia Restituta, Knight Commander (July 20, 1949); Joseph Cardinal Mindszenty Medal (Budapest) (1948); Polish Air Force Medal (April 15, 1947) Manso Cross Award (Puerto Rico)
- Military career
- Allegiance: United States
- Branch: United States Naval Reserve; United States Navy Armed Guard
- Service years: 1944–1946

James Joseph Norris (1907-1976) was an American advocate for refugees and displaced people whose humanitarian work on their behalf was global in scope and spanned three decades, from his appointment as European Director of War Relief Services, (later Catholic Relief Services), in 1946, until his death on November 17, 1976. Working in collaboration with the Holy See, (Vatican), and Monsignor Giovanni Battista Montini, (later Pope Paul VI), Norris established, in 1951, the International Catholic Migration Commission (ICMC). During his presidency of ICMC from its inception in 1951 until 1974, the agency assisted in the provision of relief, rehabilitation and resettlement assistance to over 200,000 refugees.

Because of his expertise on the subject of world poverty, Pope Paul VI appointed James Norris to serve as a Lay Auditor at the Second Vatican Council. As such, he was the only Lay Auditor to participate in the debates of the Council. On November 5, 1964, he delivered an historic intervention in Saint Peter’s Basilica before the assembled bishops of the world, entitled “World Poverty and the Christian Conscience”. Norris wrote and delivered the speech in Latin, the official language of the Roman Catholic Church, under the title: “DE PAUPERTATE MUNDIALI IN SCHEMATE DE ECCLESIA IN MUND0 HUIUS TEMPORIS”. In his speech, Norris proposed “that from this ecumenical council there come a clarion call for action that would involve the creation of a structure that would devise the kind of institutions, contacts, forms of cooperation and policy, which the Church can adopt, to secure full Catholic participation in the world-wide attack on poverty”. (English translation from the Latin original).

The week after James Norris’s intervention at the Second Vatican Council, Pope Paul VI presided at a solemn Mass in Saint Peter’s Basilica on November 13, 1964. At the end of the Mass, Pope Paul symbolically laid his Coronation Tiara on the main altar of the Basilica as a gift for the poor of the world. As the Pope did so, Archbishop Pericle Felici, Secretary General of the Second Vatican Council, read a Pontifical pronouncement informing that Pope Paul’s symbolic donation was being made “in response to the many grave words spoken in the Ecumenical Council on the misery and hunger in the modern world.” On the same date as the Pope’s donation, November 13, 1964, an article appeared in the New York World-Telegram, under the title: “Pope Paul Gives Crown to Poor.” Under the byline: Ernest Sackler, United Press International, the article read: “Pope Paul VI today donated the gold-and-diamond studded crown he wore at his coronation to open a world fund drive against poverty. It was believed that an American may have played a large role in the Pope’s decision to start a collection to combat poverty. James J. Norris, a Catholic layman from Rumson, N.J., told the Ecumenical Council that all Christians should unite in such a campaign.”

James Norris’s intervention at the Second Vatican Council led to the creation of a secretariat and working group of experts that culminated in the establishment by the Holy See of the Pontifical Council for Justice and Peace, (1967), and the Pontifical Council “Cor Unum”, (1971). Pope Paul VI appointed Norris a charter member of both Pontifical Councils. Pope Paul also designated Norris to represent the Holy See at the funeral of Dr. Martin Luther King, Jr.

In recognition of the importance of James Norris’s life’s work for refugees, he was honored with the United Nations’ highest humanitarian award, the Fridtjof Nansen Medal, (Nansen Refugee Award), awarded by the United Nations High Commissioner for Refugees in recognition of “outstanding service to the cause of refugees, displaced or stateless people.” On October 29, 1976, Norris was notified that he was to be the recipient of the Award by Prince Sadruddin Aga Khan, UN High Commissioner for Refugees. Norris died three weeks later, before the Ceremony, scheduled for December 10, 1976, (United Nations Human Rights Day). At the Palais des Nations, UN Headquarters in Geneva, Norris’s widow, Amanda, accepted the Nansen Medal posthumously on her husband’s behalf. In the acceptance speech which James Norris had prepared, and which was read at the Ceremony by his son, Stephen, Norris exhorted the world: “to keep holding high the torch of hope for those whose cause at times seems hopeless, the torch of faith for those who might waver in their belief that the world does care, and the torch of charity that tells our brother in need that we stand, in love, at his side”.

On November 19, 1976, Pope Paul VI celebrated Mass for the repose of James Norris’s soul. In a hand-written letter to Archbishop Paul Marcinkus that was passed on to Norris’s widow, Pope Paul wrote: “Abbiamo conosciuto da molti anni questo buono e fedele Cattolico, e abbiamo offerto la Santa Messa in suffragio della sua anima e per il cristiano conforto dei suoi parenti e dei suoi amici…Paulus P.P. VI" Translation: ‘We have known for many years this good and faithful Catholic and we have offered the Holy Mass for the repose of his soul and the christian comfort of his relatives and friends...Paulus P.P. VI’

On November 22, 1976, a Memorial Mass was celebrated in the Capella del Coro at Saint Peter’s Basilica. The celebrant was Joseph L. Bernardin, Archbishop of Cincinnati and President of the Catholic Relief Services executive board. The Mass was attended by many of Norris’s Vatican confreres and friends and some forty Catholic Relief Services staff members, as well as Mother Teresa, (now Saint Teresa of Calcutta).

Among the thousands of letters of condolence and tribute that James Norris’s widow received from every continent following his death, was a letter from Ignatius S. D’Souza, Bishop of Baroda, India, in which the Bishop referred to James Norris as “God’s own perfect gentleman and a great benefactor of the poor and lonely scattered around the world”. Bishop D’Souza further wrote: “Mr. James Norris, I am sure, is already enjoying the rich reward in heaven for his wonderful, noble and exemplary life; and will obtain for you the necessary grace and strength to bear the heavy cross of separation until the day dawns of eternal union and meeting. In the meantime, prayers rising up to the throne of God from thousands of grateful hearts from all over the world will certainly bring abundant blessings upon your home.”

And from Bujumbura, Burundi, where, in 1972, “Norris had faced down Burundi’s President Michel Micombero, (over the massacres between the Hutu and Tutsi ethnic groups), came a condolence letter endorsed by the six members of the CRS [Catholic Relief Services] Burundi Staff –- five signatures and a thumbprint”.

== Honors and Decorations ==
- Papal Chamberlain of the Sword and Cape—Holy See (Pontifical Honor conferred by Pope Paul VI, September 14, 1964)
- Knight of the Order of Saint Gregory the Great—Holy See (Pontifical Honor conferred by Pope Pius XII, February 11, 1947)
- Knight Commander of the Order of Saint Gregory the Great—Holy See (Pontifical Honor conferred by Pope Pius XII, September 13, 1955)
- Vice Governor General of the Equestrian Order of the Holy Sepulchre of Jerusalem—Holy See

Commander, December 16, 1969

Commander with Star, Nov. 10, 1972

Knight of the Grand Cross, Oct. 20, 1976

- United Nations High Commissioner for Refugees (UNHCR) -- Fridtjof Nansen Medal/Nansen Refugee Award 1975
- Order of Merit of the Federal Republic of Germany -- (Grand Cross of the Order, September 12, 1953)
- Order of Isabella the Catholic—Spain (Knight's Cross, March 20, 1957)
- Order of Polonia Restituta: Free Polish Government in Exile (Knight Commander, July 20, 1949)
- Polish Air Force Medal, London, April 15, 1947
- Order of the Oranje-Nassau of the Netherlands (Officer—January 14, 1964)
- Royal Order of the Phoenix—Greece (2nd Class—Grand Commander, 1955)
- Hellenic Red Cross—Greece, January 3, 1958
- Joseph Cardinal Mindszenty Medal—Budapest, Hungary 1948
- Catholic University of America—Outstanding Achievement Award of the Alumni Association, 1961
- Catholic University of America—Cardinal Gibbons Medal, 1967
- Marist Society of America—Marist Award, 1967
- Catholic University of Puerto Rico—Manso Cross Award
- Ladies of Charity—Recognition Award, 1976
- Catholic War Veterans—National Commander's Award
- Catholic War Veterans of New Jersey—For Country Award, 1965
- Ancient Order of Hibernians in America—Man of the Year Award, 1966
- Cuban Refugee Emergency Center, Miami, Florida—Outstanding Service Citation

== Honorary Degrees ==
- St. John's University (New York City), Doctor of Humane Letters (June 14, 1964)
- Seton Hall University, Doctor of Laws (June 5, 1965)
- Catholic University of America, Doctor of Humane Letters (June 6, 1965)
- Georgetown University, Doctor of Laws (June 5, 1967)

== Sources ==
- "James J. Norris Papers, Honors and Decorations". James J. Norris Papers. University of Notre Dame.
- Archbishop Pericle Felici, Secretary General of the Second Vatican Council, Pontifical pronouncement made on behalf of Pope Paul VI at the moment of Pope Paul's symbolic donation of his Coronation Tiara for the poor of the world. Saint Peter's Basilica, November 13, 1964.
- Ernest Sackler, United Press International, "Pope Paul Gives Crown to Poor", New York World-Telegram, November 13, 1964
