= Bartholomew J. Eustace =

American prelate

His Excellency, The Most Reverend Bartholomew Joseph Eustace
- Bishop of Camden
- Church: Catholic Church
- Diocese: Diocese of Camden
- Appointed: December 16, 1937
- Term ended: December 11, 1956 (his death)
- Predecessor: Office established
- Successor: Justin J. McCarthy

Orders
- Ordination: November 1, 1914 by Alessio Ascalesi
- Consecration: March 25, 1938 by Patrick Joseph Hayes

Personal details
- Born: October 9, 1887 New York City, U.S.
- Died: December 11, 1956 (aged 69) Haddonfield, New Jersey, U.S.
- Education: St. Joseph's Seminary; Pontifical North American College
- Motto: Soli Deo gloria (Glory to God alone)

Bartholomew Joseph Eustace (October 9, 1887 – December 11, 1956) was an American prelate of the Catholic Church. He served as the first bishop of the Diocese of Camden in New Jersey from 1938 until his death.

== Biography ==
=== Early life ===
Bartholomew Eustace was born October 9, 1887, on the Lower East Side of Manhattan in New York City. He was the elder of two sons of Bartholomew Ambrose and Elizabeth (née Nolan) Eustace, both natives of Ireland. His father worked as a bookkeeper.

Eustace graduated from St. Francis Xavier College in 1910. He then began his studies for the priesthood at St. Joseph's Seminary in Yonkers, New York. He won a scholarship to Rome, where he completed his theological studies at the Pontifical North American College and earned a doctorate in theology.

=== Priesthood ===
While studying in Rome, Eustace was ordained a priest for the Archdiocese of New York on November 1, 1914, by Bishop Alessio Ascalesi. Upon his return to New York the following summer, the archdiocese assigned Eustace as an assistant pastor at Blessed Sacrament Parish in New Rochelle. He remained there for one year before joining the faculty of St. Joseph's Seminary in 1916 as professor of philosophy and liturgy. During World War I, Eustace also served as a chaplain at the Pelham Bay Naval Training Station in New York City.

At St. Joseph's, Eustace earned a reputation as a liturgical scholar, publishing in 1935 an English translation of Pope Benedict XIII's 1920 Memoriale Rituum, a set of instructions for liturgy in small churches. Eustace often served as master of ceremonies to Cardinal Patrick Hayes. Among his students was James McIntyre, who would become a cardinal in 1953. He remained at the seminary for 21 years, until being appointed pastor at Blessed Sacrament Parish in September 1937.

=== Bishop of Camden ===
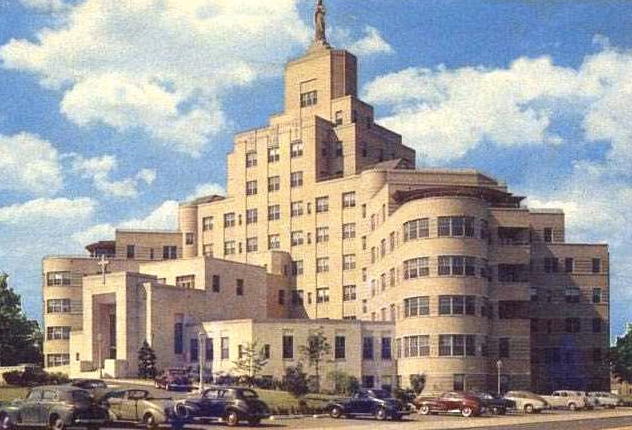
Virtua Our Lady of Lourdes Hospital, Camden, New Jersey (2014)

On December 16, 1937, Eustace was appointed bishop of the newly established Diocese of Camden by Pope Pius XI. He received his episcopal consecration on March 25, 1938, from Hayes, with Bishops Edward Kelly and Stephen Donahue serving as co-consecrators, at St. Patrick's Cathedral in New York City. More than 3,000 guests attended Eustace's consecration, including former New York Governor Al Smith, former New York City Mayor John P. O'Brien, and Eustace's elderly mother.

Following his arrival in Camden, Eustace said he believed his mother "was just a little proud of me, now that I am a bishop." Eustace took formal charge of the Diocese of Camden on May 4, 1938, when he was installed at Cathedral of the Immaculate Conception in Camden.

The new diocese, comprising six counties and 2,700 square miles in South Jersey, then contained 100,000 Catholics, 86 priests, 49 parishes, and 35 Catholic schools. During Eustace's 18 years as bishop, the Catholic population and the number of priests in the diocese more than doubled. He founded 31 parishes, 25 missions, 50 churches, 20 convents, 22 elementary schools, and four high schools.

Eustace founded two parishes specifically for African-American Catholics — St. Monica's in Atlantic City, New Jersey, (the first new parish during his tenure) and St. Bartholomew's in Camden. When St. Bartholomew's fell into financial difficulties, Eustace recruited the comedian Eddie Cantor to help it with a benefit performance in 1950. Eustace also erected Our Lady of Fatima Parish in Camden for Spanish-speaking Catholics. He established Our Lady of Lourdes Hospital at Camden in 1950 and Mercy Hospital at Sea Isle City, New Jersey, in 1953. He also founded the Angelus Convalescent Home at Wildwood, New Jersey, and St. Mary's Home for the Aged at Haddonfield, New Jersey.

Eustace was diagnosed with diabetes in 1941 and suffered three heart attacks between 1950 and 1955.

=== Death ===
Eustace was diagnosed with bladder cancer in September 1956, which confined him to his residence in Haddonfield. He died there on December 11, 1956, at age 69.His funeral Mass was celebrated by his former student, Cardinal McIntyre of Los Angeles.

== Legacy ==
Bishop Eustace Preparatory School, a coeducational private high school in Pennsauken Township, New Jersey, is named in his honor.

Catholic Church titles
Preceded by none	Bishop of Camden; 1937–1956	Succeeded by Justin J. McCarthy
