= Grace Mary Flickinger =

American nun and professor (1935–2024)

Grace Mary Flickinger SBS
- Flickinger with students
- Born: September 7, 1935; Washington, D.C.
- Died: June 11, 2024 (aged 88); Pennsylvania, United States
- Occupation(s): College professor, sports administrator, religious sister

Grace Mary Flickinger SBS (September 7, 1935 – June 11, 2024) was an American religious sister and college professor. She was a biology professor at Xavier University of Louisiana (XULA) from 1968 to 2016, and served as the school's faculty athletics representative from 1981 to 2016.

== Early life and education ==
Flickinger was born in the District of Columbia and raised in Millville, New Jersey, the youngest child of Edmond J. B. Flickinger and Helen C. Reardon Flickinger. Her mother was a nurse, and her father was a glassworker and veteran of World War I. She graduated from Sacred Heart High School in 1952. She attended Blessed Sacrament College, and earned a master's degree from Catholic University of America. She completed doctoral studies at the University of Southern Mississippi.

Flickinger joined the Sisters of the Blessed Sacrament in 1952, and professed her final vows in 1960.

== Career ==
Flickinger was a biology professor as Xavier University of Louisiana from 1968 to 2016, and was active in the school's athletic programs, and in sports administration at the conference level. She was president of the Gulf Coast Athletic Conference (GCAC) twice, from 1990 to 1991, and from 1995 to 1999. She was academic advisor to the XULA basketball team, and founded the Academic Coordination of Athletes program at XULA in 1981. She took particular interest in preparing the school's students for admission to medical schools.

Flickinger was inducted into the NAIA Hall of Fame in 1998. She received NAIA's Wally Schwartz Award in 2007. She was inducted into the XULA Hall of Fame in 2022.

Flickinger's area of research was dermatoglyphics, or the characteristics of fingerprints and palm prints, especially as indicators of health or genetic conditions.

== Publications ==
- "Dermatoglyphics of Apache and Navajo Indians" (1976, with Karen M. Yarbrough)
- "Let a Slinky Do Your Teaching!" (1978)

== Personal life ==
Flickinger retired to her order's mother house in Pennsylvania. She died in 2024, at the age of 88, in Pennsylvania. A banner honoring Flickinger is displayed in the rafters at XULA's Convocation Center.
