= Pro-cathedral =

Church serving temporarily as cathedral

A pro-cathedral (or procathedral) is a parish church that temporarily serves as the cathedral or co-cathedral of a diocese, or a church that has the same function in a Catholic missionary jurisdiction (such as an apostolic prefecture or apostolic administration) that is not yet entitled to a proper cathedral. The 'pro' is abbreviated from pro tempore ('for the time being' in Latin). A pro-cathedral is distinct from a proto-cathedral, the term in the Catholic Church for a former cathedral, which typically results from moving an episcopal see to another (usually new) cathedral, in the same or another city. In a broader context, the term "proto-cathedral" may refer to a church used by a bishop before the designation of a settled cathedral (or pro-cathedral).

== Usage ==
=== Europe ===
In Ireland, the term was used to refer specifically to St Mary's Cathedral, Dublin, the seat of the Catholic Archbishop of Dublin since the Anglican Reformation in Ireland, when Christ Church Cathedral and St Patrick's Cathedral became the property of the Anglican Church of Ireland. In November 2025, Pope Leo XIV designated St Mary's as Dublin's official Catholic Cathedral.

In Scotland, the term is used to refer to St Mary's Pro-Cathedral in Edinburgh, the seat of the Archbishop of Saint Andrews and Edinburgh, as the original St Andrews Cathedral was abandoned after the Scottish Reformation in 1560 and is currently in a ruinous state. St Andrew's Pro-Cathedral in Glasgow has been the seat of the Archbishop of Glasgow since 1889. The original Glasgow Cathedral however had been re-established as the Church of Scotland’s High Kirk of Glasgow after the Scottish Reformation.

The Anglican Parish Church of St Helier in Jersey serves as the island's pro-cathedral.

In Spain, the Colegiata de San Isidro, Madrid, served as the provisional cathedral for the Archdiocese of Madrid from its creation in 1885 until 1993, when Pope John Paul II consecrated the newly completed Almudena Cathedral.

In Valletta, Malta, there is an Anglican St Paul's Pro-Cathedral.

In Poland, the Carmelite Church, Warsaw, served as a pro-cathedral until the reconstruction of St John's Cathedral.

In Albania, the Albanese Apostolic Administration of Southern Albania had the Kisha e Shën Maria dhe Shën Luigji, in Vlore, as only episcopal see of its Eastern Catholic particular sui jurus Albanian Catholic Byzantine Church.

In Gaeta, Italy, the Sanctuary of the Santissima Annunziata was the pro-cathedral from 2008 to 2014, as the cathedral of Saints Erasmus and Marcianus and St. Mary of the Assumption was closed for restoration.

=== Asia ===
In Baku, Azerbaijan, the Church of the Immaculate Conception is the pro-cathedral episcopal see of the Apostolic Prefecture of Baku.

The Church of San Antonio de Motael was the pro-cathedral of Dili, East Timor, before the Immaculate Conception Cathedral was constructed in 1989.

In the Philippines, the Episcopal Diocese of the Central Philippines had the St. Stephen's Parish in Tondo, Manila, as its pro-cathedral before the see was transferred to the Cathedral of Saint Mary and Saint John in Quezon City. Also, in February 2012, the Pro-Cathedral Church of San Fernando de Dilao became the pro-cathedral of the Archdiocese of Manila, until the structural renovations of Cathedral-Basilica of the Immaculate Conception on March 25, 2014. The cathedral was reopened to the general public on April 9, 2014. Meanwhile, San Diego Pro-Cathedral, Silay, serves permanently as a pro-cathedral of the Diocese of Bacolod, a ready provisional co-cathedral in instances of regular repairs and maintenance being made to the main cathedral. The Minor Basilica and Archdiocesan Shrine of Our Lady of the Assumption in the town of Santa Maria, Ilocos Sur, also serves as the Co-Cathedral, as the St. Paul Metropolitan Cathedral in Vigan City is under renovation due to the damage caused by the July 2022 earthquake.

The Cathedral of the Holy Name, Mumbai, was previously the pro-cathedral of the Holy Name.

=== Americas ===
In the Roman Catholic tradition, the parish church of Old Mission San Luis Obispo de Tolosa in San Luis Obispo, California, and the parish church of Madonna Del Sasso in Salinas, California, were both elevated to pro-cathedral status by the late Bishop Richard Garcia (Bishop of Monterey, 2006-2018).

In Qu'Appelle, Saskatchewan, the parish church of Saint Peter's was the pro-cathedral for the Anglican southern Saskatchewan diocese until 1944. From 1944 to 1979, St. Paul's Cathedral served as the pro-cathedral before it was elevated to cathedral status.

In the United States, the Episcopal All Saints Cathedral in Milwaukee was designated a pro-cathedral in 1867, when it was a small downtown mission of the Diocese of Wisconsin; in 1871, it acquired a suitable building on the city's east side and formally began operating as a cathedral on June 1, 1873, attaining canonical status as a cathedral in the 1880s. The Cathedral of the Incarnation (Baltimore) was a pro-cathedral for 35 years before the Episcopal Diocese of Maryland passed a resolution in 1955 for it to become the diocesan cathedral. The Church of St. Paul the Apostle in Savannah, Georgia, is the pro-cathedral for the Episcopal Diocese of Georgia, so designated in 1993. St. Stephen's Episcopal Church in Wilkes-Barre, Pennsylvania, was designated the pro-cathedral in the Episcopal Diocese of Bethlehem in 1999 and as the pro-cathedral by the presiding bishop and the president of the House of Deputies of the Episcopal Church in 2001. St. Bartholomew's Anglican Church in Tonawanda, New York, became a pro-cathedral on August 12, 2011, as part of the North American Anglican Conference, and is the seat for Bishop Bill Atwood. Christ Church in Plano, Texas, was designated as Provincial Pro-Cathedral for the Anglican Church in North America by Archbishop Beach in November 2021.

Some churches in the United States have served as pro-cathedrals during times of expansion but were never exalted to full cathedral status, such as the Church of the Good Shepherd in Raleigh, North Carolina, which served as the pro-cathedral of the Episcopal Diocese of North Carolina, until it was decided they would have no cathedral.

Saint Patrick's Pro-Cathedral is located in the Archdiocese of New Orleans.

Furthermore, St. John Chrysostom Malankara Syrian Catholic Pro-Cathedral in Hempstead, New York, for the Syro-Malankara Catholic Exarchate in the United States

St. Joseph Pro-Cathedral is in the Diocese of Camden.

Holy Name of Mary Pro-Cathedral in Sault Ste. Marie, Michigan, is in the Diocese of Marquette.

=== Oceania ===
In Christchurch, New Zealand, St Mary's has become the pro-cathedral of the Catholic Diocese of Christchurch, in place of the Cathedral of the Blessed Sacrament which was demolished because of severe damage caused by the 2011 Christchurch earthquake.

Also in Christchurch, the Cardboard Cathedral has served as the pro-cathedral of its Anglican diocese after the 2011 earthquakes, while options to demolish or rehabilitate ChristChurch Cathedral have been extensively debated.

St John's Pro-Cathedral served as the pro-cathedral in Perth, Western Australia.

Holy Cross Pro-Cathedral in Vanimo, West Sepik, Papua New Guinea, is the see of the Diocese of Vanimo.

== See also ==
- Co-cathedral
- List of cathedrals
