= Joseph A. Williams =

American Catholic prelate (born 1974)

His Excellency, The Most Reverend Joseph A. Williams
- Bishop of Camden
- Diocese: Camden
- Appointed: May 21, 2024 (as coadjutor)
- Installed: March 17, 2025
- Predecessor: Dennis Joseph Sullivan
- Previous post: Auxiliary Bishop of Saint Paul and Minneapolis & Titular Bishop of Idassa (2022–2024)

Orders
- Ordination: May 28, 2002 by Harry Joseph Flynn
- Consecration: January 25, 2022 by Bernard Hebda, Richard Pates, Andrew H. Cozzens

Personal details
- Born: May 2, 1974 (age 52) Minneapolis, Minnesota, US
- Education: University of Minnesota Morris; Franciscan University of Steubenville; Saint Paul Seminary
- Motto: Misericordiam volo (Latin for 'I want mercy')
- Styles
- Reference style: His Excellency; The Most Reverend
- Spoken style: Your Excellency
- Religious style: Bishop

Joseph Andrew Williams (born May 2, 1974) is an American Catholic prelate serving as Bishop of Camden since 2025. He previously served as an auxiliary bishop for the Archdiocese of Saint Paul and Minneapolis from 2022 to 2024 until he became coadjutor bishop of Camden from 2024 to 2025.

== Early life ==
Williams was born on May 2, 1974, in Minneapolis, Minnesota. He has eight siblings; his brother Peter Williams is a priest in the Archdiocese of Saint Paul and Minneapolis. Joseph Williams attended Saint Croix Catholic School in Stillwater, Minnesota and graduated from Stillwater High School in 1992.

Williams studied at the University of Minnesota Morris (UMN–Morris), where he was a varsity tennis player and twice competed in the NCAA Division III men's tennis championships. He graduated from UMN–Morris with a Bachelor of Arts degree in 1996.

Williams continued his studies at the Franciscan University of Steubenville in Steubenville, Ohio. While there, he decided to become a priest. He received a philosophy/pre-theology degree from Franciscan University in 1998. Williams then entered the Saint Paul Seminary in St. Paul, Minnesota, where he was awarded a Master of Divinity degree in 2002.

== Priesthood ==
Williams was ordained to the priesthood for the Archdiocese of Saint Paul and Minneapolis by Archbishop Harry Flynn on May 28, 2002, at the Cathedral of Saint Paul in St. Paul, Minnesota. After his ordination, the archdiocese assigned Williams as parochial vicar at the Cathedral of Saint Paul Parish, He was transferred in 2004 to Divine Mercy Parish in Faribault, Minnesota. In 2005, Williams was appointed pastor of Saint Mathias Parish in Hampton, Minnesota, and Saint Mary Parish in New Trier, Minnesota. He left both parishes in 2008 to become pastor of Saint Stephen Parish in Minneapolis.

Williams in 2022 stated that during the 2020 George Floyd protests in Minneapolis, he assisted a parishioner whose apartment building was in danger of burning down. Williams personally drove the individual's family to the parish rectory for safety.

== Auxiliary Bishop of Saint Paul and Minneapolis ==
Pope Francis appointed Williams as titular bishop of Idassa and as an auxiliary bishop of Saint Paul and Minneapolis on December 10, 2021. On January 25, 2022, Williams was consecrated as a bishop by Archbishop Bernard Hebda at the Cathedral of Saint Paul, with Bishops Richard Pates and Andrew H. Cozzens acting as co-consecrators. During his time as auxiliary bishop, Williams led initiatives for Latino ministry and the implementation of the 2022 archdiocesan synod.

== Coadjutor Bishop and Bishop of Camden ==
Pope Francis named Williams as coadjutor bishop of Camden on May 21, 2024, to assist Bishop Dennis Sullivan. He was received with a mass of welcome on September 10, 2024. Williams became the ninth bishop of Camden on March 17, 2025, upon Sullivan's retirement.

== See also ==
- Church of Saint Stephen (Minneapolis, Minnesota)
- Catholic Church hierarchy
- Catholic Church in the United States
- Historical list of the Catholic bishops of the United States
- List of Catholic bishops of the United States
- Lists of patriarchs, archbishops, and bishops

Catholic Church titles
Preceded by Dennis Joseph Sullivan	Bishop of Camden; 2025–present	Succeeded by -
Preceded by -	Coadjutor Bishop of Camden; 2024–2025	Succeeded by -
Preceded by -	Auxiliary Bishop of Saint Paul and Minneapolis; 2022–2024	Succeeded by -
