= Patrick Sheridan =

American prelate

His Excellency, The Most Reverend Patrick Joseph Thomas Sheridan
- Auxiliary Bishop of New York
- Church: Catholic Church
- See: Archdiocese of New York
- In office: 1990–2001

Orders
- Ordination: March 1, 1947 by Francis Spellman
- Consecration: December 12, 1990 by John Joseph O'Connor

Personal details
- Born: March 10, 1922 New York City, New York, U.S.
- Died: December 2, 2011 (aged 89)

Patrick Joseph Thomas Sheridan K.H.S., K.M., (March 10, 1922 – December 2, 2011) was an American prelate of the Catholic Church who served as an auxiliary bishop of the Archdiocese of New York from 1990 until his retirement in 2001.

== Biography ==
=== Early life ===
Sheridan was born on March 10, 1922, in Manhattan to Patrick and Ann Sheridan. Deciding to become a priest, he attended Cathedral Preparatory School and Cathedral College of the Immaculate Conception, the two minor seminaries in Queens. After graduating in 1941 Sheridan concluded his studies for the priesthood at St. Joseph’s Seminary in Yonkers, New York.

=== Priesthood ===
Sheridan was ordained a priest for the Archdiocese of New York on March 1, 1947, at St. Patrick's Cathedral in Manhattan by Cardinal Francis Spellman. After his ordination, the archdiocese assigned him as an assistant pastor at St. James the Apostle Parish in Carmel, New York. Six months later, he was sent to Chicago to study for his Master of Education degree at the University of Chicago.

Returning to New York in 1949, the archdiocese assigned Sheridan as parochial vicar at Our Lady of Victory Parish in Manhattan. For a short period in 1956, he served at Corpus Christi Parish in Manhattan. Later in 1956, Sheridan joined the New York Apostolate Mission Band, a group of priests who toured the archdiocese performing missionary work. He also taught for .

Sheridan in 1967 was appointed as pastor of Blessed Sacrament Parish in Manhattan. He was transferred in the 1970s to Holy Rosary Church in the Bronx. During this time, he also served as episcopal vicar of the Northeast Bronx and taught for one year at Cardinal Hayes High School in that borough. In 1980, Sheridan was named as pastor of St. Joseph Parish in Bronxville in Westchester County and in 1882 as episcopal vicar for that country. He was appointed vicar general of the archdiocese in 1987.

=== Auxiliary Bishop of New York ===
Pope John Paul II named Sheridan as an auxiliary bishop of the Archdiocese of New York and titular bishop of Cursola on October 30, 1990. He was consecrated bishop on December 30, 1990 at St. Patrick's Cathedral by Cardinal John Joseph O'Connor.

O'Connor appointed Sheridan in 1993 as chancellor of the seminary system. During his tenure there, he reformed the curriculum and established a year of spirituality for the seminarians before they began their theological studies. In 1995, Sheridan was a planner for the papal visit of John Paul II to New York. Sheridan blessed the papal stage as it was being erected in the Great Lawn section of Central Park in Manhattan.

=== Retirement and legacy ===
Sheridan retired as auxiliary bishop of New York in 2001. He died on December 2, 2011.Archbishop Timothy Dolan presided over Sheridan's funeral mass at St. Patrick's Cathedral. He was buried in Calvary Cemetery in Queens.

Cardinal Edward Egan said of Sheridan “New York was the center of his life and all of his concerns. New York was greatly blessed to have this great priest and bishop.”

Catholic Church titles
Preceded by –	Auxiliary Bishop of New York; 1990–2001	Succeeded by –
