= Diocese of Camden =

Latin Catholic jurisdiction in the US

Coordinates: 39°55′33″N 75°07′11″W

Diocese of Camden Dioecesis Camdensis
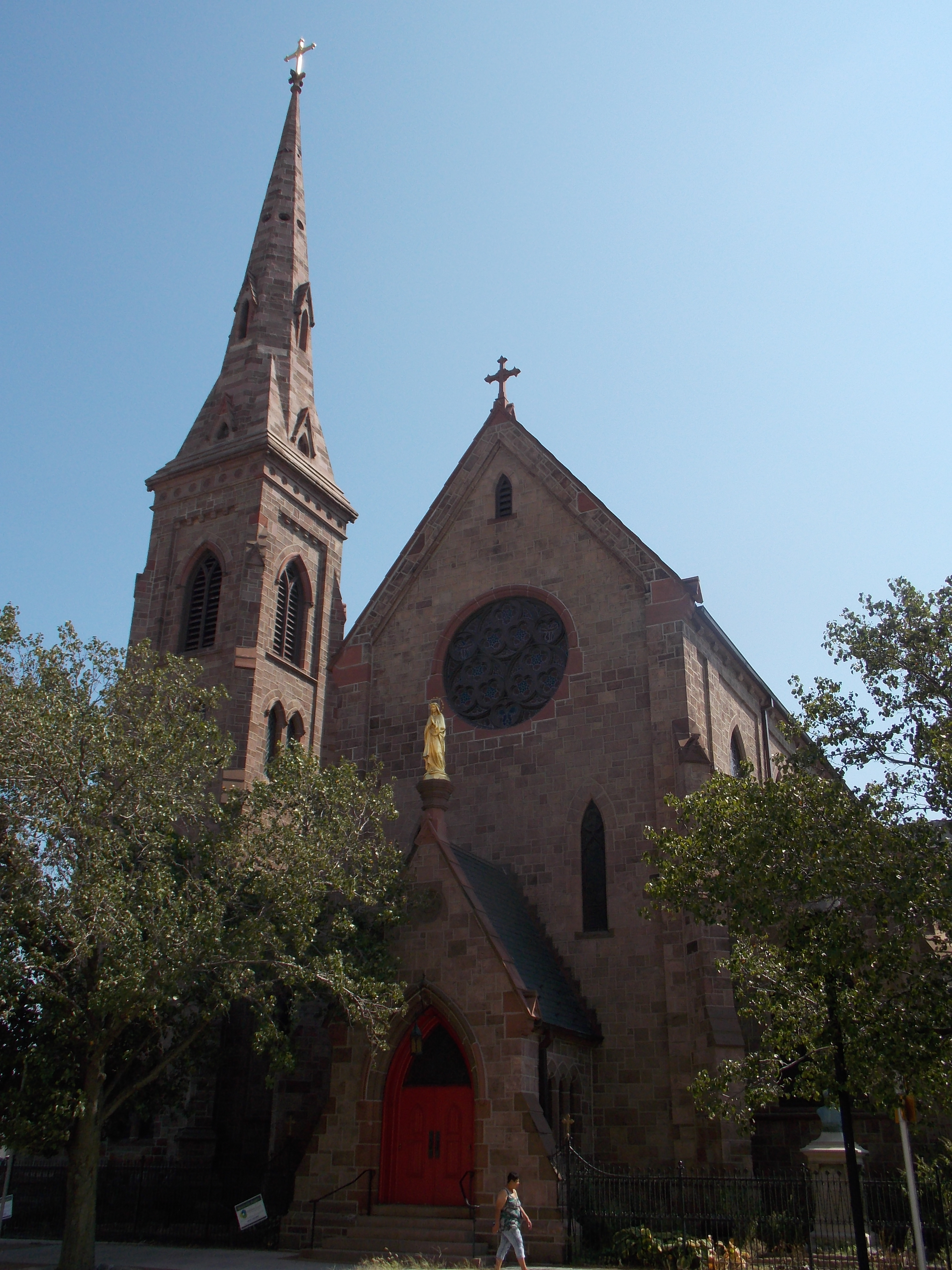
- Cathedral of the Immaculate Conception

- Coat of Arms of the Diocese of Camden

Location
- Country: United States
- Territory: (New Jersey) South Jersey
- Ecclesiastical province: Metropolitan Province of Newark

Statistics
- Population: Total; Catholics: (as of 2020); 1,414,565; 486,987 (34.5%)
- Parishes: 62

Information
- Denomination: Catholic
- Sui iuris church: Latin Church
- Rite: Roman Rite
- Established: December 9, 1937
- Cathedral: Cathedral of the Immaculate Conception
- Patron saint: Our Lady of the Immaculate Conception

Current leadership
- Pope: Leo XIV
- Bishop: Joseph A. Williams
- Metropolitan Archbishop: Joseph Tobin
- Bishops emeritus: Dennis Joseph Sullivan

Map
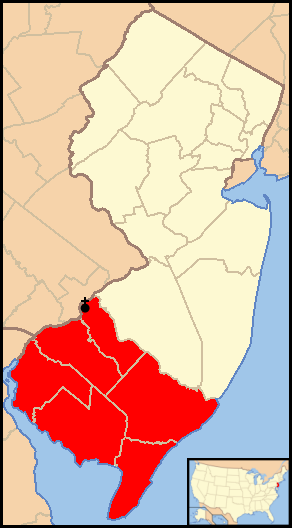

Website
- camdendiocese.org

The Diocese of Camden (Latin: Dioecesis Camdensis) is a diocese of the Catholic Church in the American state of New Jersey. It consists of about 475,000 Catholics in the South Jersey counties of Atlantic, Camden, Cape May, Cumberland, Gloucester, and Salem. The mother church is the Cathedral of the Immaculate Conception in Camden. As of 2026, the bishop is Joseph A. Williams.

== History ==
=== 1700 to 1800 ===
Although the British Provinces of East Jersey and West Jersey were not officially welcoming to Catholics, they tended to ignore their presence. The first Catholics in South Jersey were a group of Catholic glass blowers brought to Wisterburg in present-day Salem County in 1739. Traveling priests periodically traveled to the region to minister to the small congregation there.

The assistance of Catholic French troops during the American Revolution helped to abate anti-Catholic sentiment in all of the 13 original colonies. In 1784, Pope Pius VI erected the Apostolic Prefecture of United States of America, including all of the new United States. In 1789, the same pope raised this prefecture to the Diocese of Baltimore.

=== 1800 to 1900 ===
When Pope Pius VII in 1808 erected the Diocese of Philadelphia, he included the Camden area of New Jersey. In 1830, Bishop Francis Kenrick of Philadelphia dedicated the St. Mary's Church in Pleasant Mills, making it the first Catholic church in the present day Diocese of Camden.

Around 1848, a large wave of Irish Catholic immigrants fleeing the Great Famine in Ireland arrived in New Jersey. St. Mary's Church in Gloucester City was the first parish in the area, established in 1849. In Atlantic City, St. Nicholas Church opened in 1858. The first church in Camden, St. Mary of the Immaculate Conception, was finished in 1859.

In 1853, when Pope Pius IX erected the Diocese of Newark in 1853, all of New Jersey was put in this diocese. In 1881, Pope Leo XIII erected the Diocese of Trenton, taking South Jersey from the Diocese of Newark. The Camden area would remain part of the Diocese of Trenton for the next 56 years. St. Agnes Church, the first Catholic church in Cape May, was dedicated in 1883.

=== 1900 to 1956 ===
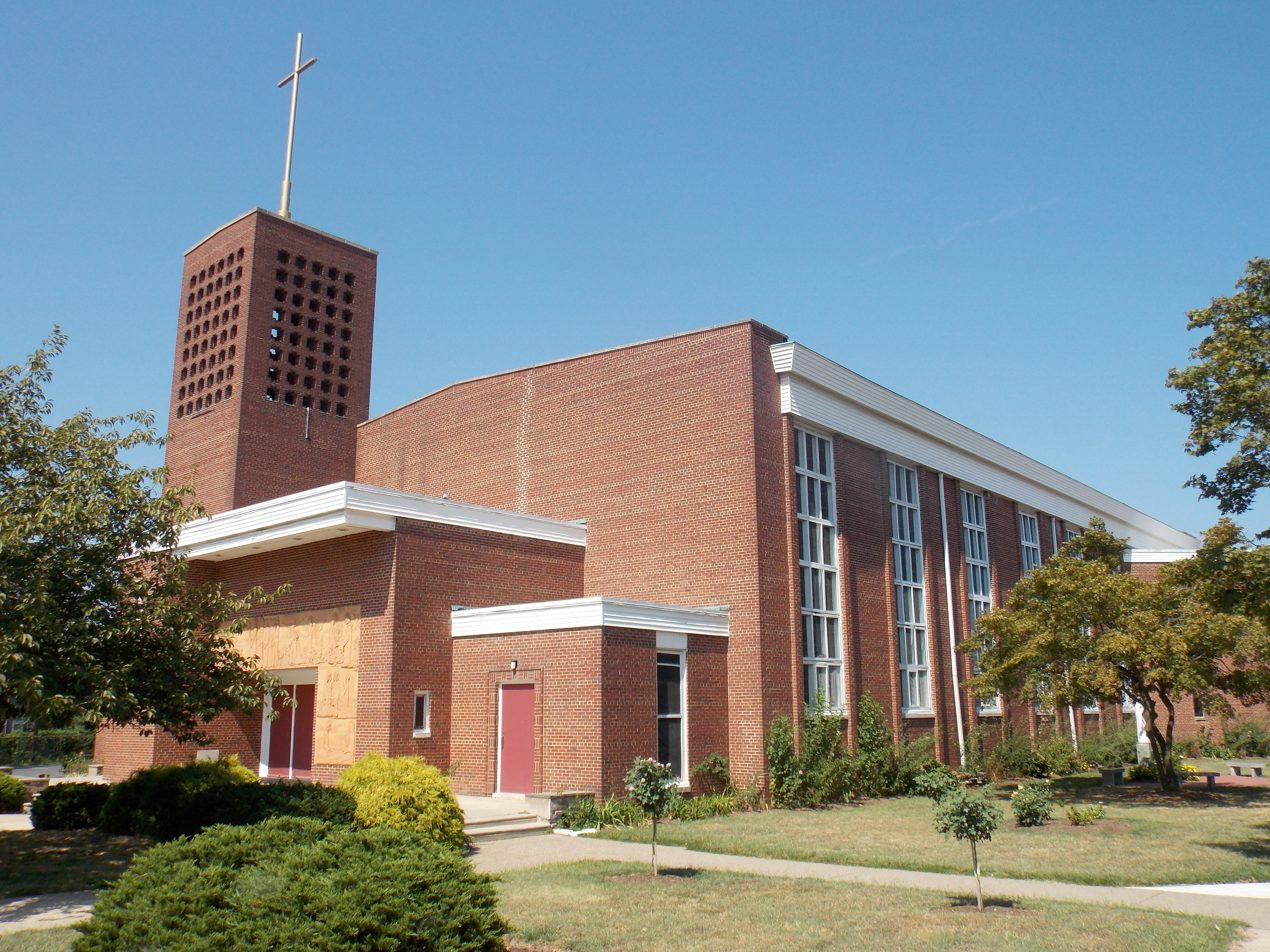
St. Joseph Pro-Cathedral, Camden, New Jersey (2015)

Pope Pius XI erected the Diocese of Camden on December 9, 1937, taking its territory from the Diocese of Trenton and designating the Church of the Immaculate Conception in Camden as its cathedral. The pope named Bartholomew J. Eustace as the first bishop of Camden. At that time, the new diocese had 75 diocesan priests and 11 religious priests to serve approximately 100,000 Catholics in 49 parishes and 31 missions, plus 30 elementary and five secondary schools.The first Catholic church in Cherry Hill, St. Mary's, opened in 1938.

Two of the parishes that Eustace founded were established specifically for African-American Catholics; St. Monica's in Atlantic City and St. Bartholomew's in Camden. When St. Bartholomew's fell into financial difficulties, Eustace recruited comedian Eddie Cantor to give a benefit performance for the parish in 1950. Eustace also erected Our Lady of Fatima Parish for Spanish-speaking Catholics. The Sisters of St. Francis opened Our Lady of Lourdes Hospital at Camden in 1950.It is today Virtua Our Lady of Lourdes Hospital. That same year, the Sisters of Bon Secours converted a donated estate in Wildwood into the Angelus Convalescent Home, a nursing facility.

Following completion of its construction in 1952, St. Joseph Church in Camden was declared a pro-cathedral because the Cathedral of the Immaculate Conception was too small for many functions. The Sisters of Mercy took over Mercy Hospital at Sea Isle City in 1953 St. Mary's Home for the Aged was founded in Haddonfield.

=== 1956 to 1968 ===
By the time Eustace died in 1956, the Catholic population and the number of priests in the diocese had more than doubled. He founded 31 parishes, 25 missions, 50 churches, 20 convents, 22 elementary schools, and four high schools.

The second bishop of Camden was Auxiliary Bishop Justin J. McCarthy of Newark, appointed by Pope Pius XII in 1957. He opened several new schools and expanded already existing ones, making room for an increase of over 5,000 students at the elementary level and 1,000 students at the high school level. At the time of his death, some 20,000 children were enrolled in CCD classes, nearly a 100 percent increase since his installation. McCarthy sent some clergy to Puerto Rico to learn Spanish so they could better serve Spanish-speaking Catholics.

In 1957, McCarthy opened a mobile chapel for migrant workers He secured in 1959 the services of four Oblates of the Sacred Heart Sisters to teach religion and do social work at Our Lady of Fatima Parish in Camden. He also erected four new parishes, founded a diocesan commission on properties and buildings, and encouraged every parish to establish a Catholic Youth Council.

Following McCarthy's death in 1959, Pope John XXIII named Celestine Damiano, the apostolic delegate to South Africa, as the third bishop of Camden in New Jersey (with the personal title of archbishop) in 1960. That same year, Damiano launched a drive to raise $5 million for the construction and improvement of Catholic secondary schools in the diocese. Using this fund drive, he built the new Camden Catholic High School in Cherry Hill, the new Holy Spirit High School in Absecon in 1964, and Paul VI High School in Haddonfield in 1966.

Damiano also opened 17 new elementary schools in the diocese, with total enrollment for all schools increasing by more than 3,000. He founded a diocesan school board in 1965, and greatly expanded the Confraternity of Christian Doctrine. He established the Spanish Catholic Center at Vineland in 1962. Damiano initiated the diocese's Brazil mission project in 1961, and the House of Charity Appeal for funding diocesan human services in 1964. He delivered the invocation for the 1964 Democratic National Convention in Atlantic City. In 1966, Damiano established a new rule to allow interracial weddings in churches instead of rectories, as had been the previous practice. He died in 1967.

=== 1968 to 2000 ===
To replace Damiano, Pope Paul VI named Auxiliary Bishop George Guilfoyle of New York as the next bishop of Camden in 1968. Following the assassination of Dr. Martin Luther King Jr. in Memphis, Tennessee, in April 1968, Guilfoyle described racism as "not a mere myth but an ugly reality" and urged Catholics to "purge every fragment of racism among us." He established a diocesan pastoral council and directed every parish to establish a parish council in 1968. He also established the Office of Pastoral Planning, the Office of Evangelization, and the Secretariat for Education. He advocated "the right to life from conception to old age," and established the Pro-Life Office in 1973.

During his tenure, Guilfoyle erected eight parishes, eleven convents, 23 churches, 37 rectories, and six schools. A retreat house was acquired by the diocese, special education facilities were expanded and a Newman Centre erected at Glassboro State College in Glassboro. The diocese built nursing homes and established two residences for the elderly; Victorian Towers in Cape May in 1973 and St. Mary's Village in Cherry Hill.Guilfoyle established an Hispanic Apostolate; Spanish-language Masses in many South Jersey parishes were instituted, while the diocese worked to obtain Spanish-speaking priests, brothers and nuns.

After Guilfoyle retired in 1989, Pope John Paul II appointed Auxiliary Bishop James T. McHugh of Newark as the next bishop of Camden. During his nine-year tenure, he reorganized the diocesan administrative structure and relocated its headquarters to downtown Camden. He presided over a diocesan synod in September 1992. McHugh created a $63 million Catholic Education Endowment Fund for schools and religious education programs, a five-point plan to reinvigorate Catholic high schools. He supported initiatives to enact school voucher legislation in the New Jersey Legislature. McHugh became coadjutor bishop of the Diocese of Rockville Centre in 1998. Auxiliary Bishop Nicholas DiMarzio of Newark was selected by John Paul II in 1999 as the sixth bishop of Camden.

=== 2000 to present ===
While bishop, DiMarzio established an Office of Ethnic Ministries, an Office of Black Catholic Ministry, and an Office of Hispanic Ministry. DiMarzio also created an apostolate to the Haitian community and founded two missions to serve the Korean and Vietnamese communities. In 2000, DiMarzio established Mater Ecclesiae Chapel in Berlin, New Jersey. It was the first canonically established mission owned by a diocese and staffed exclusively by diocesan priests to offer exclusively the Tridentine Mass. John Paul II named DiMarzio as bishop of the Diocese of Brooklyn in 2003.

To replace DiMarzio in Camden, John Paul II selected Coadjutor Bishop Joseph Galante from the Diocese of Dallas in 2004. In April 2008, Galante announced the closing of roughly half of the parishes in the diocese. This followed a previous announcement of the closing of various Catholic schools. In January 2011, a group of parishioners of the closed St Mary's Church in Malaga re-entered the building and began an around-the-clock vigil, attracting regional and national media attention.In September 2011, the diocese announced that it would continue to use St. Mary's Church for weddings and other functions.

In July 2008, the New York Post reported Galante's involvement in a scandal involving Italian real estate developer Raffaello Follieri and investor Ronald Burkle. The Post reported that Galante sold Follieri a private beach house in Wildwood for $400,000 in 2007. It also reported that one of Galante's priests misrepresented himself to potential investors. At the time, Follieri was negotiating with the Diocese of Camden and other US and Canadian dioceses to buy churches with Burkle's money and then sell them for profit. In September 2008, Follieri pleaded guilty to federal conspiracy, wire fraud, and money laundering charges, and received a 4 1/2-year prison sentence. The beach house was sold in 2010 for $310,000. Galante and Burkle were never charged with any crimes in relation to the scandal; Galante retired in 2013.

In 2013, Pope Benedict XVI appointed Auxiliary Bishop Dennis Joseph Sullivan of New York as bishop of Camden. In October 2020, the diocese filed a bankruptcy petition in the United States Bankruptcy Court for the District of New Jersey. The diocese cited civil liability arising from abuse settlements and difficulties arising from the COVID-19 pandemic as the primary sources of financial distress. Pope Francis named Auxiliary Bishop Joseph A. Williams from the Archdiocese of Saint Paul and Minneapolis as coadjutor bishop on May 21, 2024. On March 17, 2025, Williams became bishop of Camden, succeeding Sullivan.

=== Sexual abuse scandal ===
John P. Connor was arrested in October 1984 on charges of sexually assaulting a 14-year-old boy when he was a teacher at Bishop Eustace Preparatory School in Pennsauken. The assault happened at Connor's trailer in Cape May after a golf outing, with Connor describing it to the boy as a "religious experience". In a pretrial intervention with the local prosecutor, the diocese in 1984 sent Connor to the Southdown Institute in Holland Landing, Ontario, for eight months of psychological treatment. After Connor finished treatment in 1985, the Diocese of Pittsburgh accepted his transfer, where new allegations of abuse would later arise. A Diocese of Camden spokesman in 2005 said they had notified the bishop of Pittsburgh about Connor's arrest.

In 2003, Bishop DiMarzio approved an $880,000 financial settlement to 19 plaintiffs who had sued the diocese in 1994. The plaintiffs alleged sexual abuse by clergy in the diocese from 1961 through 1985. Seven of the plaintiff complaints had been dismissed in court over the years due to lack of evidence.

The Catholic dioceses in New Jersey in February 2019 released the names of clergy who had been credibly accused of sexually abusing children since 1940. Of the 188 clerics listed, 57 were based in the Diocese of Camden. In February 2020, it was reported that the dioceses had paid over $11 million to compensate 105 claims of sexual abuse claims Of these 105 claims, 98 were compensated through settlements.

In July 2020, the diocese suspended future payments to victims of clergy sexual abuse, citing the financial impact stemming from the COVID-19 pandemic. The diocese filed for Chapter 11 bankruptcy in October 2020, citing the combined impact from not only numerous sex abuse lawsuits, but also the COVID-19 pandemic. In April 2022, the diocese agreed to pay $87.5 million to settle its abuse claims, one of the largest such settlements in the United States.

== Bishops ==
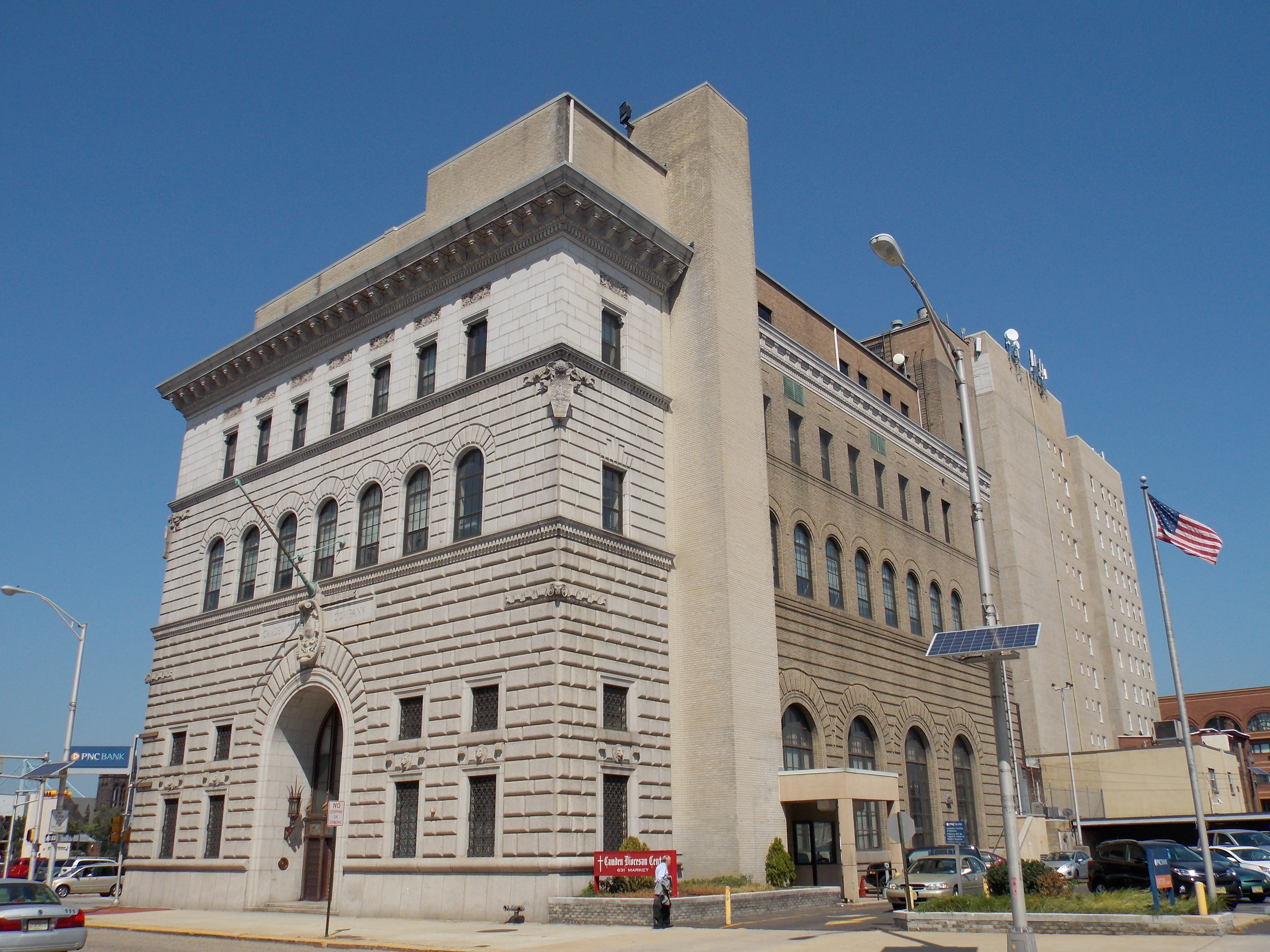
Camden Diocesan Center, Camden, New Jersey (2015)

=== Bishops of Camden ===
1. Bartholomew J. Eustace (1938–1956)
2. Justin J. McCarthy (1957–1959)
3. Celestine Damiano (1960–1967), Archbishop (personal title)
4. George Henry Guilfoyle (1968–1989)
5. James T. McHugh (1989–1998), appointed Coadjutor Bishop and later Bishop of Rockville Centre
6. Nicholas Anthony DiMarzio (1999–2003), appointed Bishop of Brooklyn
7. Joseph Anthony Galante (2004–2013)
8. Dennis Joseph Sullivan (2013–2025)
9. Joseph A. Williams, (2025–present, served as coadjutor 2024–2025)

=== Former auxiliary bishop ===
- James Louis Schad (1966–1993)

=== Other diocesan priests who became bishops ===
- Miguel Pedro Mundo (1962–1978), appointed Auxiliary Bishop of Jataí and later Bishop of Jataí
- James F. Checchio (1992–2016), appointed Bishop of Metuchen
