= Cathedral of the Immaculate Conception (Camden, New Jersey) =

Historic church in New Jersey, United States

- Church of the Immaculate Conception
- U.S. National Register of Historic Places
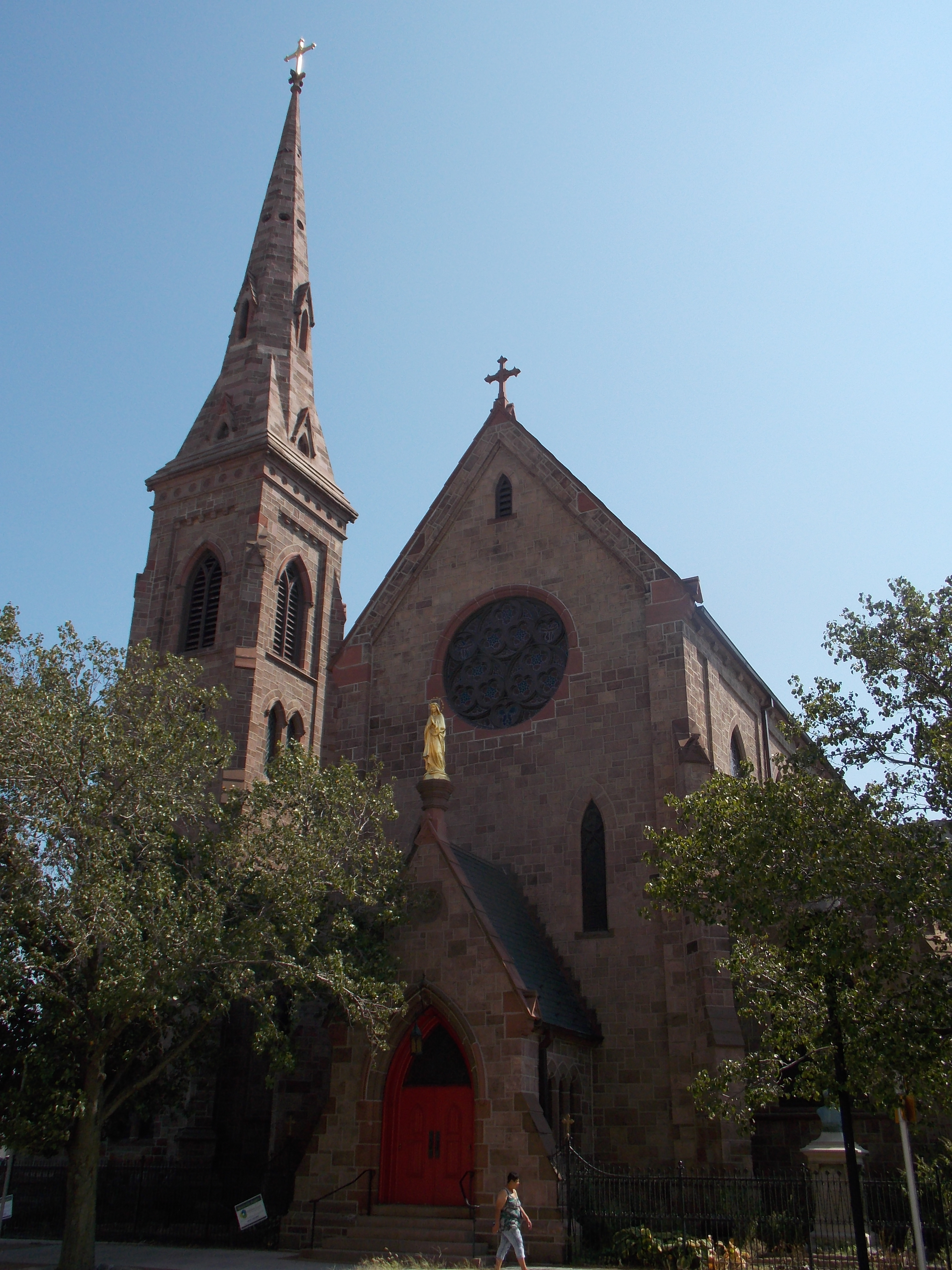
- Cathedral of the Immaculate Conception in Camden, New Jersey, September 2015

- Location within Camden County, New Jersey Location within New Jersey Location within the United States
- Location: 642 Market Street, Camden, New Jersey, U.S.
- Coordinates: 39°56′41″N 75°7′8″W
- Area: 1.8 acres (0.73 ha)
- Built: 1864
- Architect: Jeremiah O'Rourke
- Architectural style: Gothic Revival
- NRHP reference No.: 03001277
- Added to NRHP: December 10, 2003

The Cathedral of the Immaculate Conception is a Catholic Cathedral located in Camden in Camden County, New Jersey. It is the seat of the Diocese of Camden, and it was listed on the National Register of Historic Places in 2003 as the Church of the Immaculate Conception. Built in 1864, it was officially designated as a cathedral in 1937.

== History ==
=== Parish ===
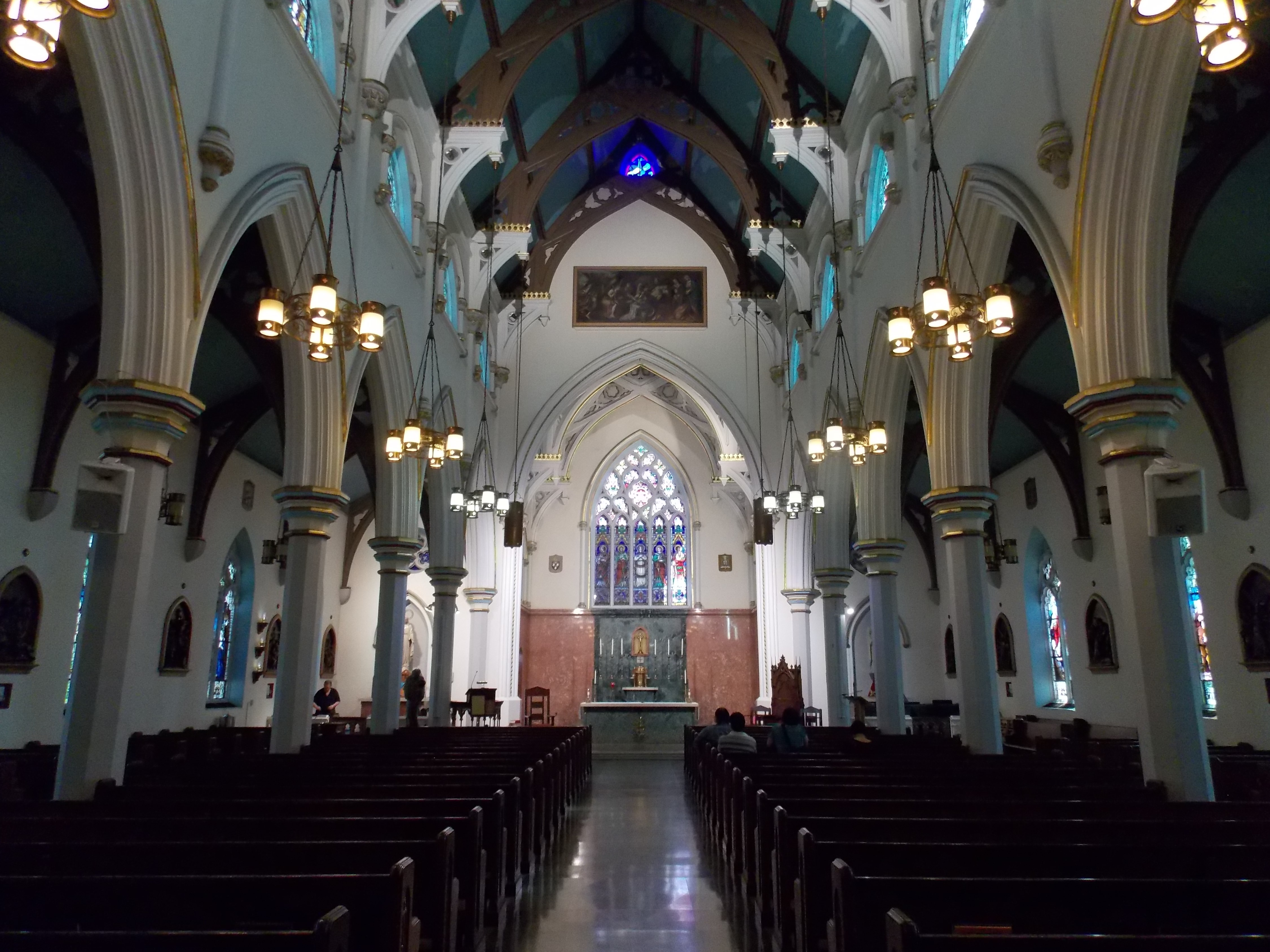
Cathedral interior

The first Catholic priests to visit the area that is now Camden were Jesuit priests from Old St. Joseph's Church in Philadelphia, Pennsylvania. They started to minister to Catholics in southern New Jersey in the 1740s where Catholicism was officially banned from being practiced. Masses and other services were celebrated in private homes. In 1796 the Augustinian priests from St. Augustine Church started ministering to Catholics in the region. They were followed sometime later by priests from the St. Mary's Cathedral in Philadelphia who served Camden until the Diocese of Newark was established in 1853. Camden became a mission of the Catholic parish in Gloucester, which had received its first resident pastor in 1851. Mass was celebrated a couple times a months in Camden in private homes and in public halls. In 1852 the hall that was regularly used for Mass was destroyed in a fire set by Nativists.

The first resident priest assigned to Camden was the Rev. James Moran who established the Church of the Immaculate Conception in 1855. Starr's Hall continued to be used for a church. Property was purchased in 1857 at Fifth Street and Taylor Avenue for a new church. Ground was broken for the new structure on June 9, 1859. The first Mass was celebrated on October 9 and dedicated on November 5 of the same year. A rectory was added in 1861.

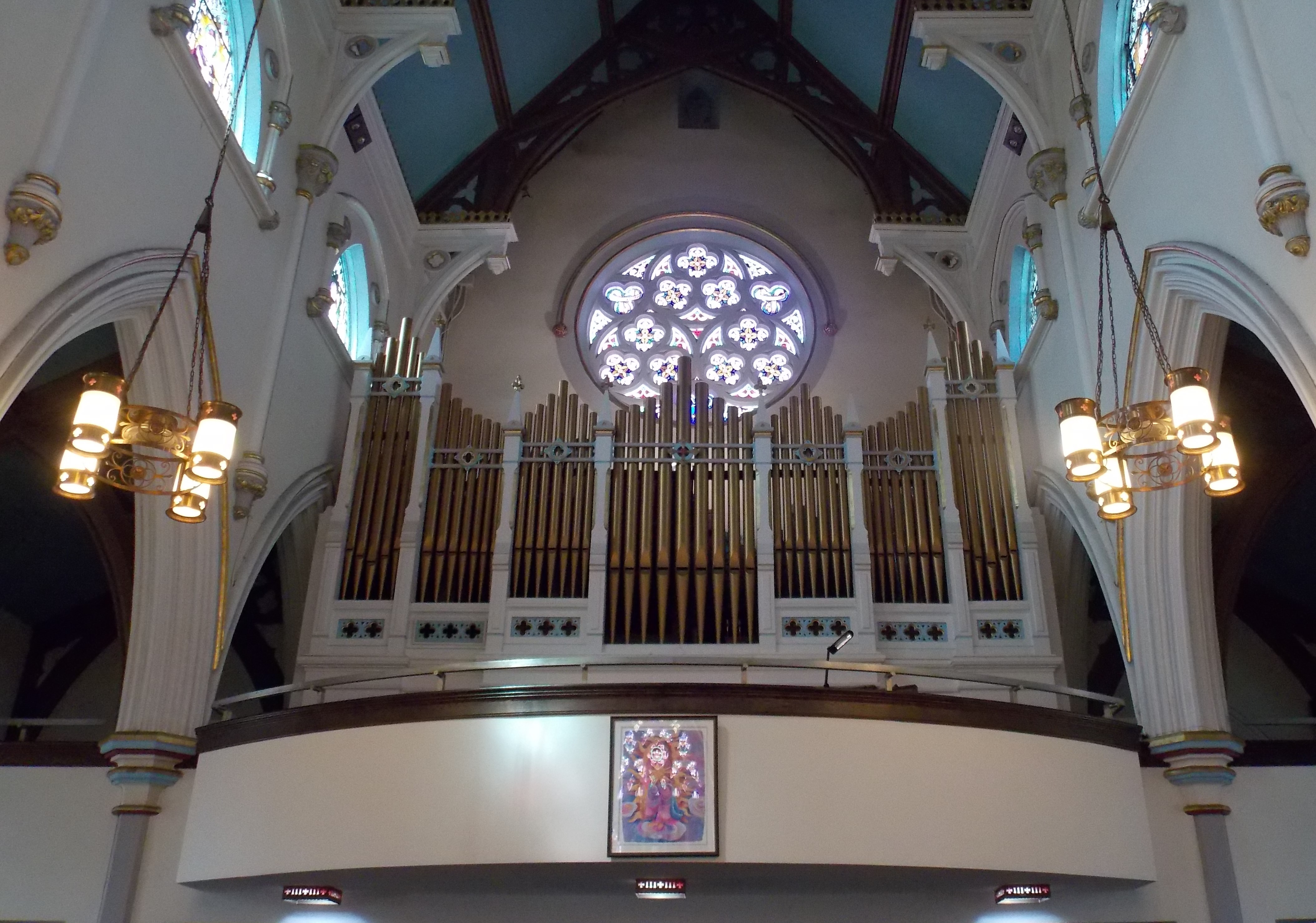
Pipe organ in the gallery

A private Catholic school was started by Sarah Fields in her home in 1859. It moved to the new church building after it was completed and became a parochial school. Initially the students were taught by lay teachers. A new school building was begun in 1871, but construction was halted during the financial panic of 1872–1873. Construction then resumed and the school building and convent were completed in 1874. That year the Sisters of St. Joseph from Chestnut Hill started teaching in the school. The Brothers of the Holy Cross taught the boys from 1881 to 1892. A house was built for them and was completed in 1882. The Sisters of St. Joseph were replaced by the Sisters of Mercy from Bordentown, New Jersey in 1885. The school has subsequently been closed.

As Irish immigration accelerated the church building became too small. Property for the present church was bought in 1864 for $7,500. Jeremiah O'Rourke from Newark was chosen as the architect. The cornerstone was laid by the Rev. Bernard McQuaid, then Vicar General of the Newark Diocese, on October 23, 1864. The church was built of stone and measured 60 by 165 feet. Though unfinished, the first Mass was celebrated in the church in July 1866. The old church was sold on August 20, 1868, and it housed a factory unit it was sold again and became a meeting hall for the Grand Army of the Republic. The church was not completed until 1888 when the tower and spire were completed. The interior was also extensively renovated in 1890 when the marble altars were added. The church was consecrated on May 27, 1893, by Bishop Michael J. O'Farrell.

In 1867 the German Catholics who immigrated to Camden formed their own parish from Immaculate Conception, Saints Peter and Paul. Camden became part of the Diocese of Trenton when it was established in 1881. The rectory, which had been built in 1861, was expanded in 1882. Sacred Heart Parish was established in 1885 from Immaculate Conception at a chapel that had been built in 1872.

=== Cathedral ===
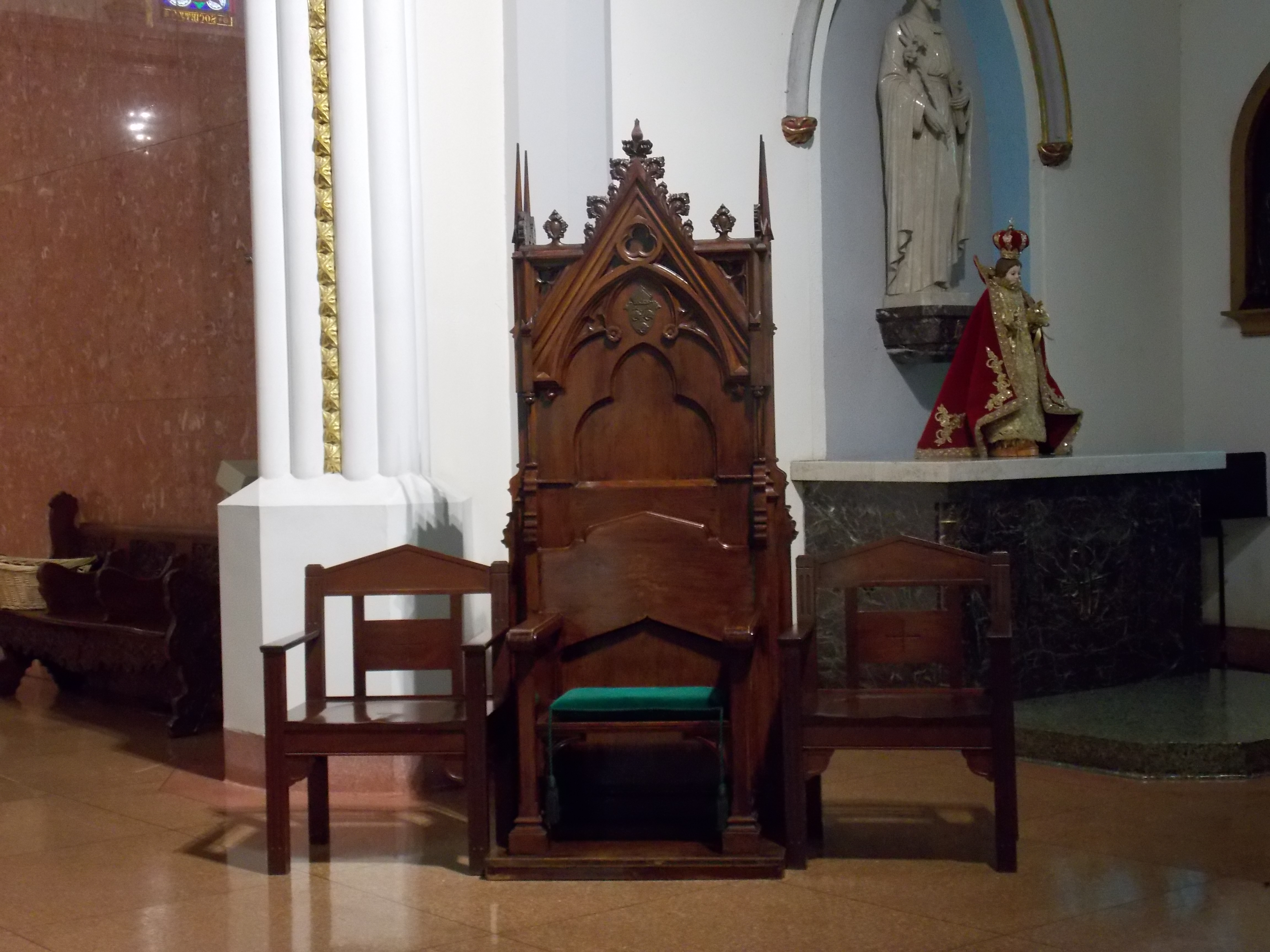
Cathedra (Bishop's chair)

As the number of Catholics continued to increase in South Jersey, Pope Pius XI established the Diocese of Camden on December 9, 1937. The Church of the Immaculate Conception became the cathedral church for the new diocese at this time. The diocese's first bishop, Bartholomew J. Eustace, was installed on May 4, 1938. The number of Catholics continued to increase in the diocese and Immaculate Conception's rather modest size necessitated St. Joseph's Church being named a pro-cathedral in the 1950s.

Demographic changes in the late 20th and early 21st century necessitated changes to the parishes in Camden. On April 4, 2008, Bishop Joseph Galante announced that the Cathedral of the Immaculate Conception would merge with Holy Name and Our Lady of Mount Carmel & Fatima parishes in Camden. The cathedral was designated as the primary worship site with a secondary worship site at Our Lady of Mount Carmel & Fatima.

== See also ==
- List of Catholic cathedrals in the United States
- List of cathedrals in the United States
- National Register of Historic Places listings in Camden County, New Jersey
