= Virtua Our Lady of Lourdes Hospital =

Coordinates: 39.92681°N 75.09545°W

- Virtua
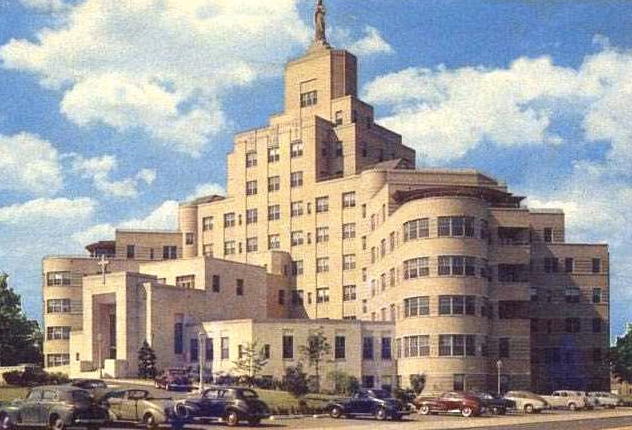

Geography
- Location: Camden, New Jersey, United States

Organization
- Type: Teaching
- Network: Virtua

Services
- Beds: 410

Helipads
- Helipad: FAA LID: NJ17

History
- Founded: 1950

Links
- Website: www.virtua.org/locations/hospital-virtua-our-lady-of-lourdes
- Lists: Hospitals in New Jersey

Virtua Our Lady of Lourdes Hospital is a teaching hospital in Camden, New Jersey that opened on July 1, 1950. It became part of the Virtua Health system in July 2019 following an acquisition and is now the hub for tertiary (advanced) care and procedures. A significant, multi-year renovation of the hospital is underway.

== Services ==
The hospital is one of the largest providers of cardiology services in Greater Philadelphia. The cardiologists specialize in angioplasty and stent placement; open heart surgery and valve replacement; electrophysiology; heart failure management; cardiac rehabilitation; and enhanced external counter pulsation, or EECP, for treatment of chest pain. In 2007, Lourdes began employing cool, pulsed laser technology to clear blockages in blood vessels of patients with peripheral vascular disease.

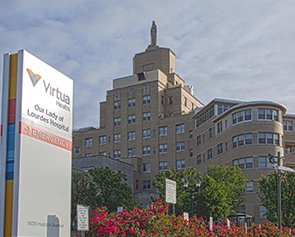
Exterior of Virtua Our Lady of Lourdes Hospital

The hospital is a state-designated Regional Perinatal Center, meaning it is equipped to handle high-risk pregnancies and typical midwifery care.

It began providing dialysis services in 1969 and began its organ transplantation program in 1974. It is the only hospital in New Jersey approved to perform kidney, pancreas and liver transplants. The statue of Our Lady atop the hospital is illuminated in green lights on the evenings following a transplant procedure.

Lourdes provides surgical services. In 2006, the hospital began offering robotic-assisted surgery as an option for performing minimally invasive urological and gynecologic procedures. Lourdes is designated as a Bariatric Center of Excellence for its weight loss surgery program.

== History ==
As part of Virtua's acquisition of Lourdes Health System, Camden Bishop Dennis J. Sullivan agreed to retain oversight of the Catholic identity of the Camden hospital. This formal relationship, known as a Catholic Sponsorship, allows Lourdes to continue its mission as part of the healing ministry of the Catholic Church.

The hospital is likely best known for the statue on its roof, which is visible in several Camden neighborhoods. Commissioned by the Franciscan Sisters of Allegany in the late 1940s for $10,000, Our Lady was carved out of Indiana limestone by a team led by sculptor Ivan L. Adams.

On March 21, 1949, workers began the week-long task of raising the statue’s six sections into place on the newly completed building. But as the workers hoisted the final piece—the head—a cable snapped. A beam went flying across the tower and the head teetered on the parapet—at risk of falling seven stories and smashing to the ground. This prompted the hospital’s first administrator, Sister Mary Paracleta, to write a note of blessing and place it inside the head asking the Blessed Mother to protect the city and hospital. Camden Bishop Bartholomew J. Eustace, who quickly got word of the near mishap, also placed a small relic of St. Francis inside the head.
