= William Smith (monsignor) =

William Bartley Smith (August 4, 1939 – January 24, 2009), was a Roman Catholic priest and professor of moral theology from the New York area in the United States of America. In addition to teaching at St Joseph Seminary in Yonkers, New York, Smith made many appearances on national media presenting a conservative Catholic viewpoint to contemporary events and questions. He also became a regular host on the Catholic television station EWTN and some of his many lectures and presentations were recorded for distribution to teach Catholic theology. Smith was hailed by conservative Catholics in America for his staunch orthodoxy following the Second Vatican Council.

== Background ==
Smith was born on August 4, 1939, and was raised in Yonkers, New York, with two older brothers. There was an active Catholic community in the town during that era and his family often had parish priests over for meals. Smith later recalled, "The home, the school, and the Church were all playing the same tune, resonating the same values, confirming and reconfirming the same direction." Smith and his brothers served as altar boys at St. Denis parish and were influenced by its clergy Joseph O'Connor and his younger associate priests (Quill & Marshall) working with him. The Smith brothers were among the altar boys that accompanied the associate priests on outings as a reward for being willing to serve at very early morning masses. Smith began to be interested in pursuing the priesthood by third grade.

== Education ==
Smith attended the Jesuit Xavier High School, where among other subjects he studied Greek and Latin and played sports. As graduation neared and Smith's desire to become a diocesan priest became known, the Jesuits tried to convince him to join their order instead. Smith declined, later recalling "oddly enough I kept saying I didn't want to be a teacher." Smith graduated in 1957 at a time when Pope Pius XII led what was seen as a very unified Roman Catholic Church; Smith later recalled the feeling using a sport's analogy – that Catholicism seemed like one large team – "some people were guards and some were ends, but here was no question where that goal line was."

Smith went on to Cathedral College, where he made a lifelong friendship with James O'Connor, who was also studying to be a priest. After two years of general studies, he transferred to the St. Joseph's Seminary in Dunwoodie, Yonkers, New York. As a seminarian, Smith's activities had to be strictly managed to maximize his development, but during his time there an exception was made which allowed extra recreation time in order to watch the television coverage of Vatican II. The seminary's dogma professor, Austin Vaughan, would go over daily reports of the Council in class, connecting its discussions with the continuity of the Catholic Church's tradition. Daniel Flynn, whom Smith had served as an altar boy, also taught him moral theology at the seminary. Smith received the Minor Orders of Tonsure on May 24, 1964 from Bishop Fearns; Porter and Lector on September 13, 1964 from Bishop McManus; and Exorcist and Acolyte on January 27, 1965 from Bishop Guilfoyle. Guilfoyle also ordained him to the Subdiaconate on April 18, 1965. Bishop Furlong ordained him Deacon on May 28, 1965. Smith finished his studies and was ordained a Priest on May 28, 1966, by Cardinal Spellman. Smith's first assignment was as an assistant pastor at St. Francis Church in Mount Kisco, New York. Subsequently, he was assigned to St. Mary's in Wappingers Falls, New York.

Smith had been viewed by his seminary professors as a good candidate for an academic career; upon their suggestion, New York's bishop, Terence James Cooke, ordered him to prepare to take advanced studies in moral theology. In the interim, Smith taught religion classes for a year at Archbishop Stepinac High School. Smith prepared to join with other New York priests, including his friend O'Connor, to go to Rome to pursue a doctoral degree, but events led otherwise. When Cardinal Cooke was placed on the board of directors of The Catholic University of America, the school's president complained that the archdiocese sent all its priests abroad for study rather than at his college. In response, Cooke directed Smith to attend Catholic University instead.

Arriving at Catholic University in the autumn of 1969, Smith found many movements in the theology department that he viewed as violating the doctrines and magisterium of the Catholic Church, a state of events he recalled by characterizing it as "the silly season had emerged." Smith was particularly disturbed by the idea that a Catholic institution was encouraging people to take up sides "for" or "against" Catholic teaching – acting as if doctrine were a matter of politics. Rather than argue endlessly with dissenting faculty, Smith decided to endeavor to get his degree (a doctorate of Sacred Theology) as quickly as possible so he could assume the profession commanded by his bishop. Smith's October 29, 1971, doctrinal thesis was entitled "Selected methodological questions in the fundamental moral theology of Francis J. Connell, C.SS.R.".

== Ministry ==
After receiving his degree, he became the professor of Moral Theology at St. Joseph's Seminary in 1971. As a result of the theological tumult in the Roman Catholic Church in America after Vatican II, Smith found many of the seminarians he was educating were unsure of the essentials of their faith. Soon after Smith became a professor, auxiliary bishop of New York Austin Vaughan (who had taught him dogma as a priest) became rector of the seminary and held the organization to a conservative view of Catholicism.

Throughout the 1970s, issues of ethics arose in New York politics and within the national public forum; when asked for a Catholic response, Cooke often called on Smith to be a spokesman, as did Cooke's successor, Cardinal O'Connor. Due to the large media presence in New York City, Smith was soon called on to speak for his church on television programs including the Today Show, The Phil Donahue Show, The David Susskind Show, 20/20, The First Estate: Religion in Review with Dr. Russell Barber, Good Morning America, Firing Line, and CNN. In addition, Smith wrote numerous articles and gave many lectures, including some that were filmed for educational purposes (such as the "Keep the Faith" series). In 1977, Smith was made Dean of St. Joseph Seminary. Smith's other responsibilities included assisting at the Immaculate Heart of Mary parish in Scarsdale, New York, and being seasonal Vice-Chancellor of the Archdiocese of New York. Smith was often consulted on moral matters by former students and priests of the archdiocese. He further served as chaplain for the South Bronx house of the Missionaries of Charity. In this last capacity, Smith traveled to Calcutta, India, in 1983 to preach retreats to Mother Teresa and her order during Christmas.

Fearing that orthodox Catholic intellectuals might feel isolated in the post-Vatican II American culture, Smith collaborated in creating the Fellowship of Catholic Scholars and served as its president from 1981 to 1983.

In March 1986, after receiving a recommendation by O'Connor, Pope John Paul II conferred the title of Monsignor on Smith.

Smith soon became a regular host for the Catholic television station EWTN, where his dry wit made him a popular presenter (often appearing alongside Mother Angelica). He also spoke on behalf of the Confraternity of Catholic Clergy on several occasions and spoke at seminars sponsored by Opus Dei. He was a regular speaker at convocations at Gannon University in Erie, PA, for nineteen years alongside other notable conservative Catholics such as George Rutler, Kenneth Baker, and Bob Levis.

Smith, having taught at St. Joseph Seminary from 1971 until 2009, was the longest-serving faculty member in history. Smith died of pneumonia on January 24, 2009, at St. Joseph's Hospital in Yonkers at the age of 69.

Smith was hailed for his dry wit, clarity, and staunch orthodoxy among Catholics in the United States. John Trigilio went so far as saying at his death that they had lost "an American version of Cardinal Ratzinger...[and] A modern day Aquinas when it came to moral theology." At his death, Catholics linked him with Richard John Neuhaus, who died two weeks earlier, saying, "The Archdiocese of New York has lost another giant."
