= James Patrick Mahoney (New York bishop) =

American priest (1925–2002)

His Excellency, Most Reverend James P. Mahoney
- Auxiliary Bishop of New York
- Church: Catholic Church
- See: Titular See of Ipagro
- Appointed: July 25, 1972
- In office: September 15, 1972 - May 10, 1997

Orders
- Ordination: May 19, 1951
- Consecration: September 15, 1972 by Terence Cooke

Personal details
- Born: August 16, 1925 Kingston, New York
- Died: June 1, 2002 (aged 76) New York, New York
- Motto: To be rich in faith

James Patrick Mahoney (August 16, 1925 – June 1, 2002) was an American prelate of the Catholic Church in the United States . He served as an auxiliary bishop of the Archdiocese of New York from 1972 to 1997.

== Biography ==
=== Early life ===
Jame Mahoney was born on August 16, 1925 in Kingston, New York. He was ordained a priest for the Archdiocese of New York in St. Patrick's Cathedral in Manhattan by Cardinal Francis Spellman on May 19, 1951. In 1971, Mahoney was appointed as vicar general for the archdiocese.

=== Auxiliary Bishop of New York ===
Pope Paul VI appointed Mahoney as titular bishop of Ipagro and an auxiliary bishop of New York on July 25, 1972. He was consecrated bishop in St. Patrick's Cathedral by Cardinal Terence Cooke on September 15, 1972. The principal co-consecrators were Coadjutor Archbishop John Maguire of New York and Auxiliary Bishop Patrick Ahern.

=== Retirement and legacy ===
Mahoney continued to serve as an auxiliary bishop until his resignation was accepted by Pope John Paul II on May 10, 1997. He died of cancer in Calvary Hospital in the Bronx on June 1, 2002, at age 76. He was buried in Assumption Cemetery in Cortlandt, New York.

Catholic Church titles
Preceded by –	Auxiliary Bishop of New York; 1972–1997	Succeeded by –
