= Francisco Garmendia =

Spanish-born bishop

Most Reverend Francisco Garmendia
- Auxiliary Bishop of New York
- Church: Catholic Church
- See: Titular See of Limisa
- Appointed: May 24, 1977
- In office: June 29, 1977 - October 30, 2001

Orders
- Ordination: June 29, 1947
- Consecration: June 29, 1977 by Terence Cooke

Personal details
- Born: November 6, 1924 Lazcano, Spain
- Died: November 16, 2005 (aged 81) New York, New York

Francisco Garmendia (November 6, 1924 – November 16, 2005) was a Spanish-born bishop of the Catholic Church in the United States. He served as an auxiliary bishop of the Archdiocese of New York from 1977 to 2001.

== Biography ==
=== Early life ===
Francisco Garmendia was born on November 6, 1924, in Lazcano, Spain.

Garmendia was ordained a priest in Vitória, Spain, by Archbishop Carmelo Ballester y Nieto for the Canons Regular of the Lateran on June 29, 1947. He served as a priest in Argentina before he was incardinated into the Archdiocese of New York in 1975. In 1976, he was named pastor of St. Thomas Aquinas Parish in the Bronx.

=== Auxiliary Bishop of New York ===
Pope Paul VI appointed Garmendia as titular bishop of Limisa and auxiliary bishop of New York on May 24, 1977. He was ordained a bishop at St. Patrick's Cathedral in Manhattan by Cardinal Terence Cooke on June 29, 1977. The principal co-consecrators were Coadjutor Archbishop John Maguire and Auxiliary Bishop Patrick Ahern. Garmendia became the first Hispanic bishop for the archdiocese. Garmendia was named as the vicar for Spanish pastoral development.

In October 1981, Garmendia joined five other bishops in a statement denouncing the development of a neutron bomb by the U.S. Department of Defense.

In 1990, Garmendia co-founded Hope Line (La Linea de la Esperanza), a non-profit organization serving the South Bronx community. It was created after the 1990 arson attack at the Happy Land social club in the Bronx that killed 87 people. Hope Line started with a bilingual telephone counseling and referral service. It later expanded to include a diaper distribution program, a food pantry a SNAP benefit enrollment office, virtual income tax preparation, financial literacy workshops and referral services.

=== Death ===
Garmendia continued to serve as an auxiliary bishop until his resignation was accepted by Pope John Paul II on October 30, 2001. He died at the Rosary Hill Nursing Home in Hawthorne, New York, on November 16, 2005, at age 81.

Catholic Church titles
Preceded by –	Auxiliary Bishop of New York; 1977–2001	Succeeded by –
