= Emerson John Moore =

African-American Roman Catholic prelate

His Excellency, The Most Reverend Emerson John Moore
- Auxiliary Bishop of New York
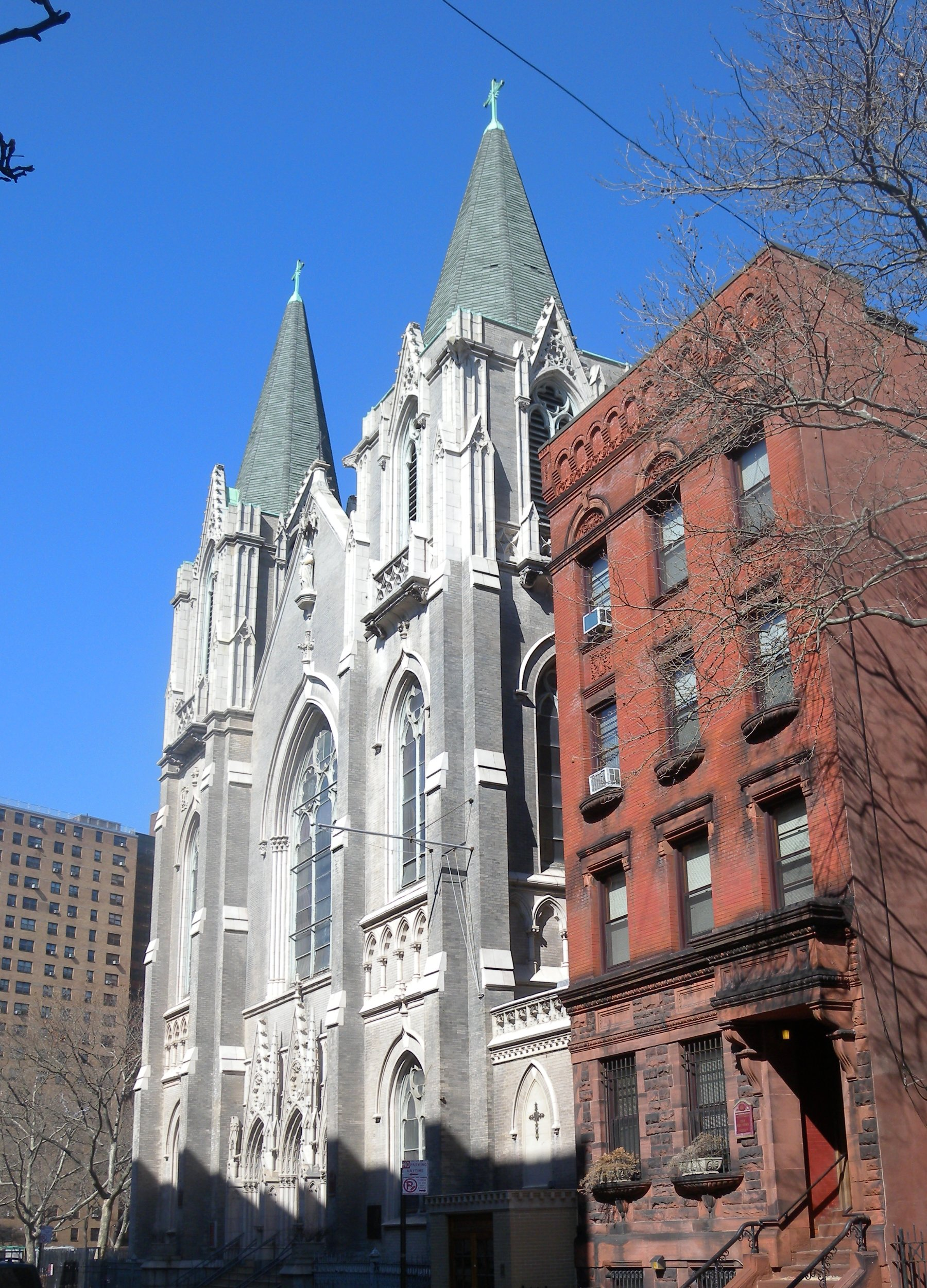
- St Charles Borromeo Church, Harlem
- In office: 1982–1995

Orders
- Ordination: May 30, 1964 by Francis Spellman
- Consecration: September 8, 1982 by Cardinal Terence Cooke

Personal details
- Born: May 16, 1938 Harlem, New York City, US
- Died: September 14, 1995 (aged 57) Center City, Minnesota, US
- Denomination: Roman Catholic
- Education: Cardinal Hayes High School
- Alma mater: Cathedral College; Columbia University; New York University

Emerson John Moore Jr. (May 16, 1938 – September 14, 1995) was an American Catholic prelate who served as an auxiliary bishop for the Archdiocese of New York from 1982 to 1995. He was the first black monsignor in the United States and the first such bishop in the archdiocese.

== Biography ==
=== Early life and education ===
Emerson Moore was born in the Harlem section of New York City on May 16, 1938. He was the son of a subway motorman and a hospital nurse. He was raised in the Bronx, where he attended Cardinal Hayes High School. Born into a Baptist family, he converted to Catholicism at age 15 in 1953.

Moore studied for the priesthood at Cathedral College in Manhattan and at St. Joseph's Seminary in Yonkers, New York. He later earned a Master of Social Work degree from Columbia University in Manhattan and a Master of Public Administration degree from New York University.

=== Priesthood ===
On May 30, 1964, Moore was ordained a priest for the Archdiocese of New York by Cardinal Francis Spellman at St. Patrick's Cathedral in Manhattan. After his 1964 ordination, the archdiocese assigned Moore as an assistant pastor at St. Augustine Church in Ossining, New York and then at the Church of the Holy Family Parish in Manhattan.

In 1968, Moore joined with the National Black Catholic Clergy Caucus in describing the American Catholic Church as a "white racist institution." In 1969, he became director of the Lt. Joseph P. Kennedy Jr. Memorial Community Center and of the central office of Catholic Charities, both in Harlem. Moore also founded the Office for Black Ministry in the archdiocese.

In 1975, Moore was named pastor of St. Charles Borromeo Parish, also known as "Harlem's Cathedral." Cardinal John J. O'Connor described Moore as "the most popular preacher in town." In 1978, the Vatican elevated Moore to the rank of monsignor, becoming the first African American to receive that honor. In 1979, Moore welcomed Pope John Paul II to Harlem, where the pope addressed congregants at St. Charles Borromeo.

=== Episcopacy ===
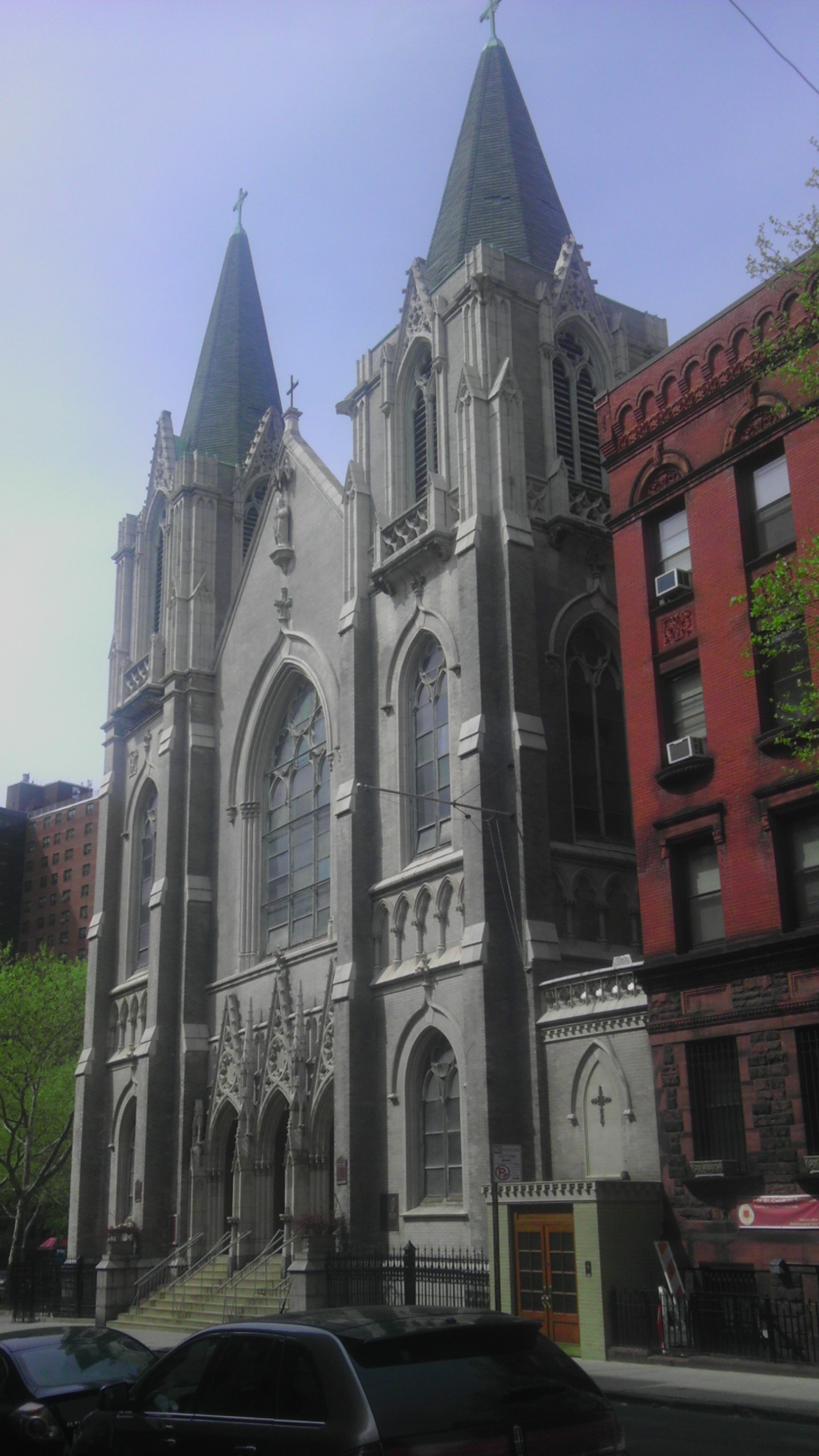
St. Charles Borromeo Church, Harlem, New York City (2014)

On July 3, 1982, Moore was appointed auxiliary bishop of New York and titular bishop of Curubis by John Paul II. He received his episcopal consecration on September 8, 1982, from Cardinal Terence Cooke, with Archbishop John Maguire and Bishop Harold Perry serving as co-consecrators. Moore was the sixth African-American to serve as a Catholic bishop in the United States and the first to serve in the archdiocese.

As an auxiliary bishop, Moore continued to serve as pastor of St. Charles Borromeo, a post which he held until 1989. He also served as archdiocesan vicar for African-American Catholics, a board member of Catholic Relief Services, chair of the Africa Development Council, and a member of the New York State Commission on Government Integrity.

During the 1984 presidential election, Moore supported Democratic civil rights activist Jesse Jackson, because Jackson was "the only one forcing people to look at hard issues." That same year, Moore was arrested alongside City Clerk David Dinkins during an anti-apartheid protest outside of the South African consulate in Manhattan. In 1990, Moore was the only bishop to sign an appeal made by Call to Action for major reforms in the Catholic Church, including the ordination of women and the repeal of clerical celibacy.

In early 1994, Moore entered the Hazelden Foundation, a drug and alcohol treatment center in Center City, Minnesota.Moore had suffered from substance abuse problems for several years. He would periodically leave his public ministry to seek treatment, often missing events and suffering from financial difficulties. While at Hazelden, Moore admitted to addictions to crack cocaine and alcohol. He was also diagnosed with HIV/AIDS.

=== Death and legacy ===
On September 14, 1995, Moore died at Hazelden from HIV/AIDS at age 57.The archdiocese said that he died of "natural causes of unknown origin". O'Connor said he could not discuss the circumstances of Moore's death, but said that he would not be ashamed if one of his priests or bishops contracted HIV/AIDS.

At Moore's funeral at St. Patrick's Cathedral, O'Connor discussed the challenges that Moore faced as an African-American bishop in the Catholic Church, saying:

"It is not enough that a black bishop be ordinarily intelligent. He is expected to be extraordinarily intelligent. It is not enough for him to preach adequately; he must preach brilliantly. It is not enough for him to be polite; he must be the essence of courtesy. If he speaks with pride of being black, he's racist; if he supports civil rights, he's a threat. If he praises white people, he's an Uncle Tom. He is expected to be a paragon of priestliness, yet be more human than the weakest among us. In short, if he cannot walk on water, he's an utter failure; if he walks on water too easily, he has forgotten his 'place'."

Catholic Church titles
Preceded by –	Auxiliary Bishop of New York; 1982–1995	Succeeded by –
