= Anthony Francis Mestice =

American prelate

His Excellency, The Most Reverend Anthony Francis Mestice
- Church: Roman Catholic
- Archdiocese: New York
- Appointed: March 5, 1973

Orders
- Ordination: June 4, 1949
- Consecration: April 27, 1973

Personal details
- Born: December 6, 1923 New York City, US
- Died: April 30, 2011 (aged 87) Saint John's Island, South Carolina
- Denomination: Christian-Roman Catholic
- Education: Cathedral College; St. Joseph's Seminary

Anthony Francis Mestice (December 6, 1923 – April 30, 2011) was an American prelate of the Roman Catholic church who served as an auxiliary bishop of the Archdiocese of New York from 1973 to 2001.

== Biography ==
=== Early life ===
Anthony Mestice was born on December 6, 1923, in New York City, the son of Consiglia and Donato Mestice. Donato Mestice was a tailor. Anthony attended St. John the Evangelist School and then entered Cathedral College, a seminary high school in Manhattan. After graduating from Cathedral, he entered St. Joseph Seminary in Yonkers, New York.

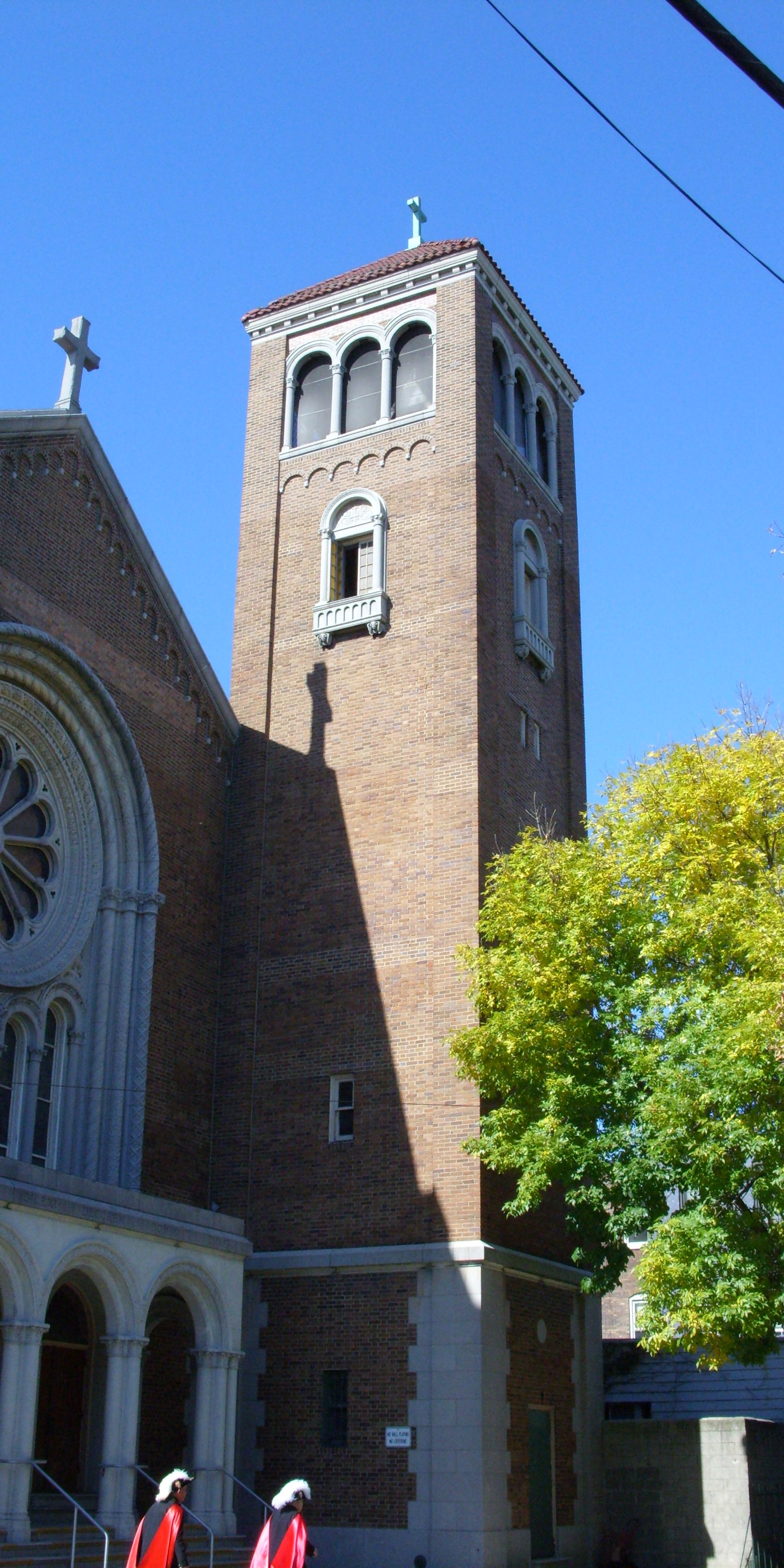
St. Dominic's Church, New York City

=== Priesthood ===
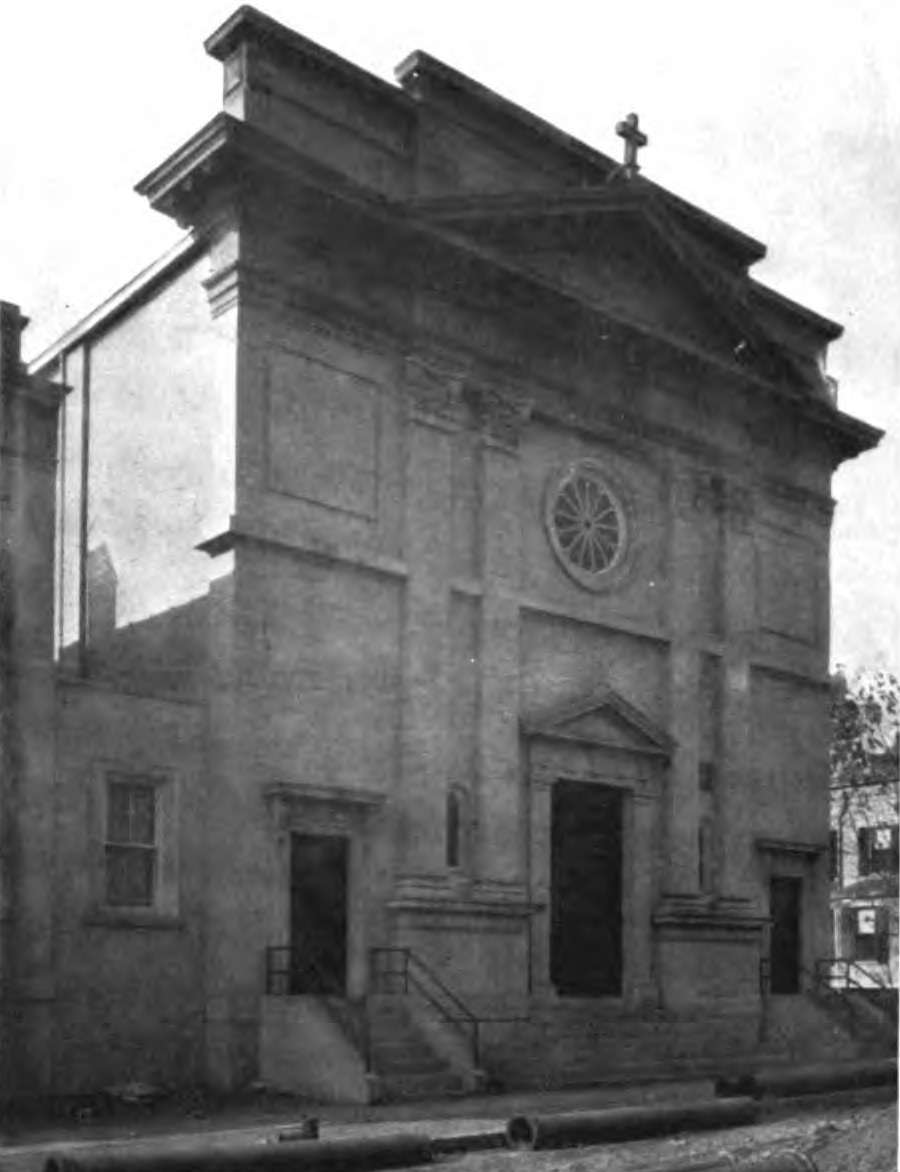
St. Anthony's Church, New York City

Mestice was ordained a priest for the Archdiocese of New York on June 4, 1949, by Cardinal Francis Spellman. The archdiocese assigned Mestice as an assistant pastor at St. Anthony’s Parish in the Bronx.

In 1969, after 20 years at St. Anthony's, Mestice was named as pastor of Our Lady of Mount Carmel Parish in Poughkeepsie, New York. He was transferred in 1972 to serve as pastor of St. Dominic’s Parish in the Bronx.

=== Auxiliary Bishop of New York ===
On March 5, 1973, Mestice was appointed as an auxiliary bishop of New York by Pope Paul VI. Mestice was consecrated at St. Patrick's Cathedral in Manhattan by Cardinal Terence Cooke on April 27, 1973. In 1978, Mestice was named episcopal vicar of Dutchess County in New York and pastor of Holy Trinity Parish in Poughkeepsie.

On May 13, 1981, Mestice was in St. Peter's Square in Vatican City when Pope John Paul II was shot by an assailant. After the pope was taken away, a woman placed a picture of Our Lady of Czestochowa on the pope's empty chair and asked Mestice to pray for him.

Mestice retired as auxiliary bishop of New York on October 30, 2001. He died at the Mary Manning Walsh Home in Lenox Hill, Manhattan on April 30, 2011.

Catholic Church titles
Preceded by –	Auxiliary Bishop of New York; 1973–2001	Succeeded by –
