= Robert Lombardo =

Robert Lombardo may refer to:

- Robert Lombardo (composer) (1932–2026), American composer and composition teacher
- Robert J. Lombardo (born 1957), American Catholic bishop

== See also ==
- Robert Lombard (1895–1972), South African Protestant minister
