= Munatiana =

Titular see in Tunisia

Africa Proconsularis.

Munatiana was an ancient Roman-Berber civitas located in the province of Byzacena in the present-day Sahel region of Tunisia. The former town was also the seat of an old Christian diocese, which remains a titular bishopric of the Roman Catholic Church.

The only known bishop of this diocese is Vittorino, who participated in the council of Cabarsussi, held in 393 by the Maximianists, a dissident sect of the Donatists, and he signed the deeds of the Council.

Today Munaziana survives as a titular bishopric of the Catholic Church. Robert J. Lombardo, CFR, newly appointed auxiliary Bishop of Chicago, has held the title since his consecration on November 13, 2020. He succeeded Ronald Aldon Hicks, auxiliary bishop of Chicago, who previously held the title since 2018. Milton Luis Tróccoli Cebedio held the title from 2009 to 2018.
