= Patrick Ahern =

American Roman Catholic prelate

His Excellency, The Most Reverend Patrick Vincent Ahern
- Auxiliary Bishop of New York; Titular Bishop of Naiera
- Church: Roman Catholic Church
- See: Archdiocese of New York
- In office: 1970 to 1994
- Other post: Titular Bishop of Naiera

Orders
- Ordination: January 27, 1945 by Francis Spellman
- Consecration: March 19, 1970 by Terence Cooke, John Joseph Maguire and Edwin Broderick

Personal details
- Born: March 8, 1919 New York City, US
- Died: March 19, 2011 (aged 92)
- Education: Manhattan College; Cathedral College; St. Louis University; University of Notre Dame

Styles of Patrick Ahern
- Reference style: The Most Reverend
- Spoken style: Your Excellency
- Religious style: Monsignor

Patrick Vincent Ahern (March 8, 1919 – March 19, 2011) was an American prelate of the Roman Catholic Church. He served as an auxiliary bishop of the Archdiocese of New York from 1970 to 1994.

== Biography ==
=== Early life ===
Patrick Ahern was born on March 8, 1919, in Manhattan. He first attended Blessed Sacrament School and St. Agnes Boys High School, both in Manhattan. He then went to Manhattan College in the Bronx and Cathedral College in Queens He began his studies for the priesthood at St. Joseph's Seminary in Yonkers, New York.

Ahern later attended St. Louis University in St. Louis, Missouri, and the University of Notre Dame in South Bend, Indiana.

=== Priesthood ===
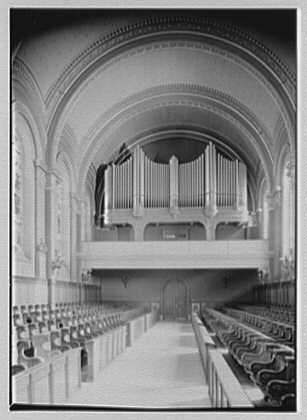
St. Joseph's Seminary, Yonkers, New York (1943)

Ahern was ordained a priest of the Archdiocese of New York by Cardinal Francis Spellman at St. Patrick's Cathedral in Manhattan on January 27, 1945. After his 1945 ordination, the archdiocese assigned Ahern as a curate at St. Helena's Parish in the Bronx. He then worked with the Archdiocesan Mission Band until 1955, when he was named a curate at St. Patrick's Cathedral.

Ahern taught at St. Joseph's Seminary before Spellman named him as his priest seary in 1958. In 1967, Ahern was named as pastor of Our Lady of Angels Church in the Bronx.

=== Auxiliary Bishop of New York ===
On February 3, 1970, Ahern was named an auxiliary bishop for New York and titular bishop of Naiera by Pope Paul VI. He received his episcopal consecration on March 19, 1970, from Cardinal Terence Cooke, with Archbishop John Maguire and Bishop Edwin Broderick serving as co-consecrators, at St. Patrick's Cathedral.

In 1972, Ahern and another cleric walked out of a Catholic Interracial Council dinner in New York City. They did not want to be present during a speech by New York Governor Nelson Rockefeller, who had just vetoed a New York Legislature bill on abortion rights for women.

As an auxiliary bishop, Ahern continued to serve at Our Lady of Angels Church and was named episcopal vicar for the Bronx. He served as episcopal vicar for Staten Island and pastor of Blessed Sacrament Parish in Staten Island from 1980 to 1990. While at Blessed Sacrament, he established the Seton Foundation, which created schools and programs for children with special needs. He then became archdiocesan vicar for development.

=== Death and legacy ===
After reaching the mandatory retirement age of 75, Ahern resigned as an auxiliary bishop on April 26, 1994. He died on March 19, 2011 He was widely regarded as one of the foremost experts on the spirituality of the French sister, Thérèse de Lisieux.

The Bishop Patrick V. Ahern High School in Staten Island is named after Patrick Ahern.

== Published works ==
- Maurice and Therese: The Story of a Love, Doubleday, 2001. ISBN 978-0-385-49740-4

== Awards ==
- 2007: Eleanor and Paul Proske Memorial Award for Distinguished Service to the Poor

Catholic Church titles
Preceded by –	Auxiliary Bishop of New York; 1970–1994	Succeeded by –
