= Sara Butler =

Academic background
- Education: Fordham University (B.S., PhD); Catholic University of America (M.A.)

Academic work
- Discipline: Theology
- Institutions: University of Saint Mary of the Lake

Sara Butler is an American Catholic theologian and member of the Missionary Servants of the Most Blessed Trinity. She was one of the first two women named as members of the International Theological Commission in 2004.

== Early life and education ==
Butler is from Toledo, Ohio.

Butler received a bachelor of science degree from the Fordham University School of Education, a master of arts degree from the Catholic University of America, a licentiate in sacred theology from the University of Saint Mary of the Lake, and a Ph.D. from Fordham University in theology with a dissertation on "Intercommunion in an American Perspective."

Butler entered the Missionary Sisters in 1956.

== Career ==
She taught theology at the University of Saint Mary of the Lake in the Archdiocese of Chicago and at Saint Joseph Seminary in the Archdiocese of New York.

She is a past president of the Academy of Catholic Theology. She also served on the Anglican-Roman Catholic International Commission. In 2012, she was named an expert for the general session of the Synod of Bishops in the Catholic Church on the topic "The New Evangelization for the Transmission of the Christian Faith." She was also a consultant to the Pontifical Council for the New Evangelization.

As of 2016, Butler was professor emeritus of dogmatic theology at the University of Saint Mary of the Lake

== Publications ==
=== Books ===
- Butler, Sara (2006). The Catholic Priesthood and Women: A Guide to the Teaching of the Church. Chicago: Hillenbrand Books. ISBN 978-1-59525-016-2.

=== Chapters ===
- Butler, Sara (2013). "Catholic Women and Equality: Women in the Code of Canon Law". In Failinger, Marie; Schiltz, Elizabeth; Stabile, Susan J. (eds.). Feminism, Law, and Religion. London: Imprint Routledge.

=== Articles ===
- Butler, Sara (1997). "Women's Ordination and the Development of Doctrine". The Thomist: A Speculative Quarterly Review. 61 (4): 501–524. doi:10.1353/tho.1997.0000. ISSN 2473-3725.
- Butler, Sara (2019). "Feminist Christology: A New Iconoclasm?". The Thomist: A Speculative Quarterly Review. 83 (4): 493–519. doi:10.1353/tho.2019.0042. ISSN 2473-3725.
