= Benedict Groeschel =

American Franciscan friar and author

The Very Reverend Benedict Joseph Groeschel C.F.R.
- Founder and Community Servant
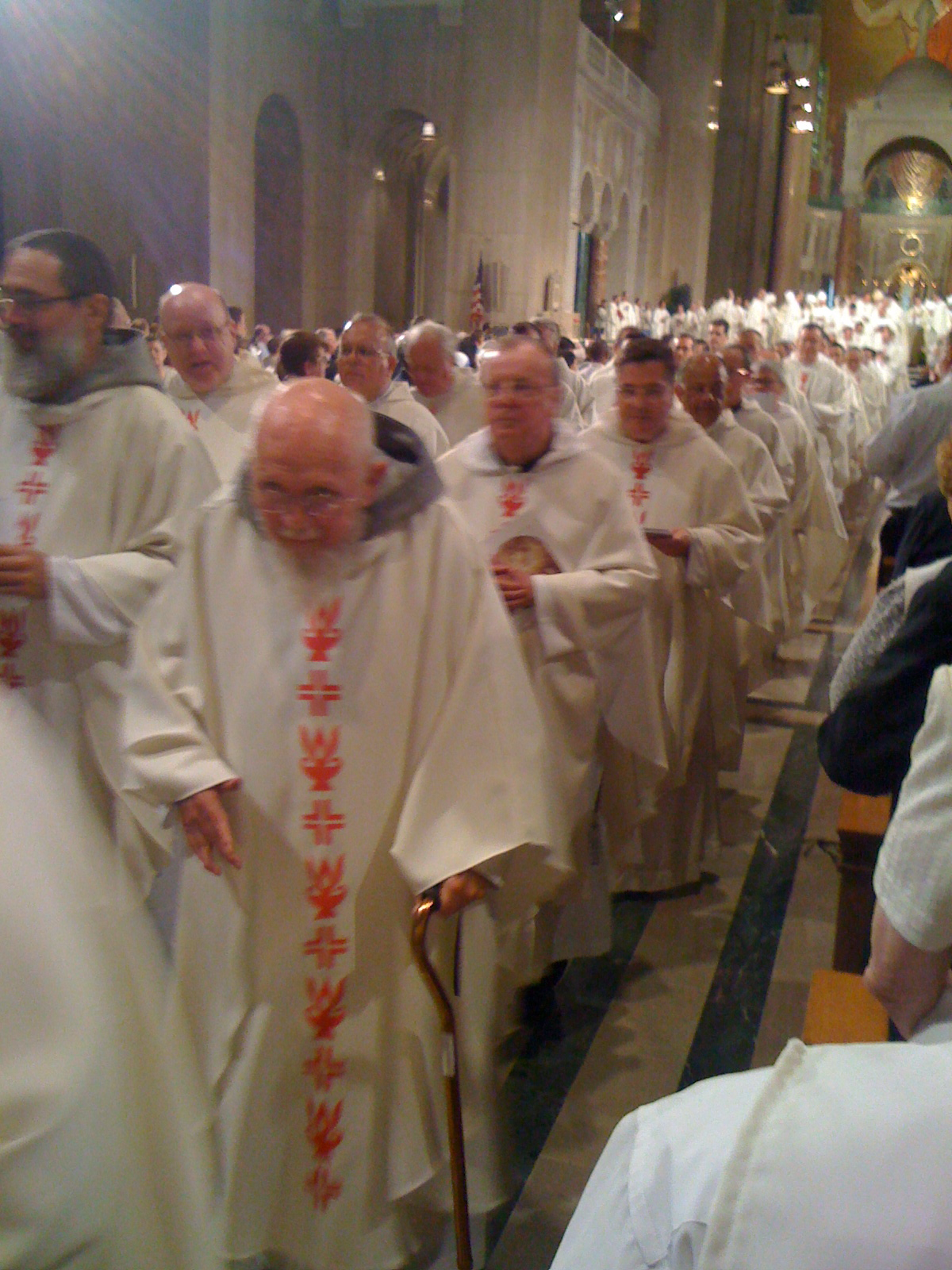
- Groeschel in 2009
- Church: Catholic Church
- Elected: 1987

Orders
- Ordination: 1959

Personal details
- Born: Robert Peter Groeschel; July 23, 1933 Jersey City, New Jersey, United States
- Died: October 3, 2014 (aged 81) Totowa, New Jersey, United States
- Denomination: Roman Catholic
- Education: B.A. in religion, D.Ed. in psychology

Benedict Joseph Groeschel, C.F.R. (July 23, 1933 – October 3, 2014) was an American Franciscan friar, Catholic priest, retreat master, author, psychologist, activist, and television host. He hosted the television talk program Sunday Night Prime (originally Sunday Night Live) on the Eternal Word Television Network, as well as several serial religious specials.

Originally a Capuchin friar, Groeschel cofounded the Franciscan Friars of the Renewal (or CFRs), intended as a reform branch for the Capuchin charism stressing a renewed emphasis on poverty, service to the poor, Eucharistic and Marian devotion, and fidelity to Catholic doctrine. Groeschel served as lifelong Chairman of the Good Counsel homes for homeless pregnant women and their babies, which he described as a "work of God," cofounding these with Christopher Bell. This maternity home system offered an "open intake" model, i.e. one which turns no woman away for any reason whatever. Groeschel founded the Office for Spiritual Development of the Archdiocese of New York, as well as acting as Archdiocesan liaison for St. Teresa of Calcutta's Missionaries of Charity during Mother Teresa's lifetime. At the invitation of New York's Cardinal Terence Cooke, Groeschel acted as Associate Director of the Trinity Retreat House for clergy and executive director of St. Francis House. Groeschel served as professor of Pastoral Psychology at St. Joseph's Seminary in New York, as adjunct professor at the Institute for Psychological Sciences in Arlington, Virginia, and as an advisor for St. Michael's Institute in Manhattan headed by Dr. Philip Mango. Among Groeschel's close friends were St. Teresa of Calcutta, Mother Angelica, Christopher and Joan Bell, Dr. Philip Mango, Dr. Paul Vitz, and Dr. Alice von Hildebrand.

Some recipients of the "Father Benedict Groeschel Award" awarded by Good Counsel each year have included, but are not limited to: Cardinal Timothy M. Dolan; Laura Ingraham; Michael Knowles; Larry Kudlow; Jeanne Mancini; Rev. Gerald Murray; Rev. George Rutler; William Simon, Jr. and Peter Simon.

== Early life and education ==
Born Robert Peter Groeschel on July 23, 1933, in Jersey City, New Jersey, he was the eldest of the six children of Edward Joseph Groeschel and Marjule Smith Groeschel.

Groeschel attended Catholic elementary and high school (Immaculate Conception High School in Montclair, New Jersey) and then in 1950 he entered the Capuchin Order's St. Felix Friary in Huntington, Indiana. As a novice at St. Felix's Groeschel met and was deeply impressed by Blessed Solanus Casey. After nine months in Indiana, Groeschel completed his novitiate at the order's friary in the Detroit Province in 1951.

The following year, he was admitted to temporary profession of vows and given the religious name of Benedict Joseph, after a Franciscan saint, Benedict Joseph Labre. In later life he would often comment that he felt it significant that his patron saint in the order was most likely schizophrenic.

Groeschel made his perpetual profession in 1954 and was ordained a priest in 1959. He received a master's degree in counseling from Iona College in 1964 and a Doctor of Education (D.Ed.) degree, with a specialty in psychology, from Teachers College, Columbia University in 1971.

== Career ==
In 1960, Groeschel became the chaplain for the Children's Village, a facility for emotionally disturbed children based in Dobbs Ferry, New York. In 1965, he joined the staff of St. Joseph's Seminary. He has taught at Fordham University, Iona College and Maryknoll Seminary. In 1967, he founded the St. Francis House in Brooklyn, New York, which provides a safe haven for young men looking for a new start in life. In 1974, Cardinal Terence Cooke, Archbishop of New York, asked him to establish the Trinity Retreat in Larchmont, New York, which provides spiritual direction and retreats for clergy. In 1984, Archbishop (future Cardinal) John Joseph O'Connor, Cardinal Cooke's successor, appointed Groeschel to the position of promoter of the cause of canonization of Cardinal Cooke. (Cardinal Cooke is recognized as a Servant of God as of May 2015.)

In the 1980s Groeschel became an early supporter and a popular weekly host for the Catholic television station Eternal Word Television Network (EWTN). Michael Warsaw, the chairman and chief executive officer of EWTN stated "In many of the most difficult days in the history of EWTN, Father Benedict was a strong and vocal supporter of Mother Angelica."

In 1985, Groeschel co-founded, with Christopher Bell, the Good Counsel Homes for homeless pregnant women and children.

In 1987, responding to the call of Pope John Paul II for religious orders to renew their communities, Groeschel and seven Capuchin colleagues broke away from their order "to follow a more traditional religious life that highlighted communal living and traditional garb while serving the poor and needy." They formed the Franciscan Friars of the Renewal with the mission of preaching reform and serving the poor. At the time of his death the order had grown to "115 brothers and priests and 31 sisters in nine friaries in the U.S., four in Europe and two convents in Central America."

After joining the Institute of Psychological Sciences in 2000, Groeschel taught an annual intensive course focused on how to give practical assistance to people experiencing trauma, extreme stress, and sorrow, while at the same time integrating religious values with counseling and psychotherapy.

Groeschel was Chairman of St. Francis House and the Good Counsel Homes. He was on the board of Ave Maria University in Naples, Florida, and was a member of the American Psychological Association. He was also involved with the Padre Pio Shelter, St. Anthony Residence, St. Francis Youth Center, and St. Benedict Joseph Medical Center in Honduras. The late Donna Summer, the queen of disco music paid tribute to Groeschel in the liner notes of her studio album Cats Without Claws originally released in 1984, when it became available as a compact disc a few years later. She said, "To Father Benedict Groechel, and father Glenn Sudano - for the inspiration on the line "Cats Without Claws." Fr Sudano is one of eight original Franciscan Friars of the Renewal, and Summer was married to his brother Bruce Sudano.

== Author and activist ==
Throughout his career, Groeschel was "an outspoken opponent of abortion and was quick to defend the church against what he saw as unfair criticism, which endeared him to conservative Catholics in particular."

Groeschel received wide public attention through his preaching engagements, writing and television appearances. He was the author of over 30 books and recorded more than 100 audio and video series. He published articles in several Catholic magazines on a monthly basis. His last books included The Tears of God (2008), Questions and Answers About Your Journey to God (2007), The Virtue Driven Life (2006), and Why Do We Believe? (2005) His weekly television program, Sunday Night Live with Father Benedict Groeschel, offered a mix of interviews, answering viewer questions and discussing spiritual and social matters relating to the Catholic faith.

Groeschel was a highly visible Catholic activist, firstly in the Civil Rights movement. He publicly criticized insulting depictions of the Catholic Church in popular culture and the media. In September 1998, he led protests outside an Off-Broadway theater in New York City against the production of Terrence McNally's play Corpus Christi. In his 2002 book, From Scandal to Hope, he accused The Boston Globe, The New York Times, and the San Francisco Chronicle of revealing anti-Catholic prejudice in their coverage of the sexual abuse scandal that disrupted the church. "Seldom in the history of journalism have I seen such virulent attacks on any institution that is supposed to receive fair treatment in the press", he wrote.

In April 2005, following the election of Cardinal Joseph Ratzinger as Pope Benedict XVI, Groeschel said that the new pope had "been very badly abused by the American media". He thought that the pope's experiences during World War II had been distorted and his personality misrepresented.

== Car accident ==
On January 11, 2004, Groeschel was struck by an automobile while crossing a street in Orlando, Florida. He "suffered numerous broken bones and intracranial bleeding", and over a four-hour period, he had no blood pressure, heartbeat or pulse for about 20 minutes. A few days later the trauma triggered a near-fatal heart attack. While he was recovering from his injuries, he collaborated with John Bishop on the book There Are No Accidents: In All Things Trust in God. He broadcast his first live program on EWTN on October 24, 2004. Although the accident left him with limited use of his right arm and difficulty in walking, he resumed preaching and giving retreats by the end of 2004 and he continued to keep a full schedule. As he told The New York Times nearly four years after his accident: "They said I would never live. I lived. They said I would never think. I think. They said I would never walk. I walked. They said I would never dance, but I never danced anyway."

== Other health issues ==
In 1984 Groeschel had heart problems that were addressed by bypass surgery.

In 2009 Groeschel, then age 75, suffered a minor stroke overnight March 20–21. The stroke caused temporary cognitive and speech difficulties that were noticeable in his March 29 appearance as the host of EWTN's Sunday Night Live With Father Benedict Groeschel, where he made the condition public. During the show Groeschel stated the stroke was the reason Father Andrew Apostoli (also from his community) had replaced him the previous week and stated that he had decided to return so soon "so that viewers who may be suffering in some way won’t give up."

Notably during the broadcast Groeschel misspoke Apostoli’s name as "Father Augustine" and "confused a recent story in the news when he said that the University of Notre Dame was receiving an award from President Obama." It was reported that as the program continued "he was speaking much more normally. He even poked fun at himself for getting Father Andrew’s name wrong: 'I’ll never live that down.'"

== Comments on sexual abuse ==
Since 1973 Groeschel served as the director of spiritual development for the Archdiocese of New York. It was in this capacity as a "defender of the priesthood" that he was drawn into the sexual abuse scandals that came to light in the early 2000s. Groeschel's expertise was focused on clarifying critical psychological issues pertinent in the screening of stable and orthodox seminarians. The goal of this process was to identify those able to stand up to the tremendous pressures of the work to which they are called. The aim of this work was to protect both potential victims as well as clerics.

In 2002 with large numbers of public allegations arising accusing priests of sexual abuse against minors, Groeschel caused some controversy during a sermon at a Yonkers church. He described the news reporting on the matter as a "media persecution" against Catholicism intended "to destroy whatever public influence the church might have." This perception of persecution was one "many church officials concurred in", The New York Times would later report. Groeschel also told the Yonkers audience that "I've met with some of those people [the accused priests] and they are among the most penitent people I have met in my life. When you pick up the media, you don’t hear about the penitence."

Groeschel also made controversial comments in a 2012 interview published by the National Catholic Register, leading to the end of his public career. The interview related to the sexual abuse of children by priests, with Groeschel stating: "Suppose you have a man having a nervous breakdown, and a youngster comes after him. A lot of the cases, the youngster — 14, 16, 18 — is the seducer." On August 30, he issued a statement:

I apologize for my comments. I did not intend to blame the victim. A priest (or anyone else) who abuses a minor is always wrong and is always responsible. My mind and my way of expressing myself are not as clear as they used to be. I have spent my life trying to help others the best that I could. I deeply regret any harm I have caused to anyone.

The Franciscan Friars of the Renewal organization also apologized for Groeschel's remarks, noting that they were out of character for him and stemmed from infirmities due to his 2004 car accident and a recent stroke. On September 3, EWTN announced that Groeschel had resigned from his position as host of Sunday Night Prime and that other members of his order would serve as the show's host.

== Death ==
Due to declining health, Groeschel had moved into St. Joseph's Home for the elderly in Totowa run by the Little Sisters of the Poor. He died there at 11 pm on October 3, 2014.

He had an ongoing medical condition that was grave enough that preparations to memorialize his life, including a Facebook tribute, were begun on September 9, 2014, by members of his religious order. On September 30, 2014, the Cardinal Newman Society announced on their Facebook page that they had received word that Groeschel "fell and re-injured the same arm that was hurt in his accident ten years ago" and asked for people to request prayers of intercession for his health from "Venerable Solanus Casey, a former roommate of Fr. Groeschel who is up for beatification". Doctors informed him that they felt it was inadvisable to attempt to repair the damaged arm (a fractured elbow and shoulder) as he was already in a weakened condition from the ongoing illness and was unlikely to survive surgery. He returned home but continued to have great pain. He died due to complications from his ongoing illness.

On the day of his death Groeschel met with Michael Mencer who as a child had his juvenile macular degeneration reversed, which he and his family accredited to the intercession of Sister Miriam Teresa Demjanovich, S.C. This event was accepted by the Vatican as a miracle that qualified Demjanovich to be beatified—this was set to be declared at a Mass the next day at the Cathedral Basilica of the Sacred Heart in Newark (the first such beatification Mass to be held in the U.S. rather than Rome). Both Demjanovich and Groeschel had been born in Bayonne, New Jersey. Mencer had the relic of Demjanovich (a strand of her hair) that he had carried with him when he felt his vision problems lift and loaned it to Groeschel who blessed himself with it.

Br. Shawn Conrad O'Connor, C.F.R. was with Groeschel at the time of his death. O'Connor stated that after "kind of a rough day" of pain, Groeschel and he prayed the rosary accompanying the recording of Mother Angelica on EWTN. After the prayer O'Connor noticed that Groeschel was unresponsive and he could not find his pulse. After a few times asking for a response O'Connor noticed his mouth and eyes move, and felt that Groeschel was either asleep or in a "little trance" that he had been going into lately. O'Connor then lay down. A few minutes later a nurse came in and determined that Groeschel had died. O'Connor stated that Groeschel's last conscious action had been to pray the rosary and held that it was "a beautiful way to go."

O'Connor noted that due to illness and pain Groeschel "for the last two years and especially the last month...he really suffered...It seemed like he was doing his Purgatory right there in front of you...he really suffered and took a lot of time off Purgatory I think". Father Andrew Apostoli, noting this pain, recalled that Groeschel had told him "'I prayed to God that I would be able to suffer some great suffering before I die so that I could give a good example to people.' That seems to be how God answered that prayer."

Members of his order held the timing of his death was providential as that night was not only the vigil before a woman from his hometown was to be beatified, but also because it fell on the vigil of the Feast of St. Francis of Assisi (their founder) according to the Catholic liturgical calendar. (This vigil is also called the "Transitus" by Franciscans where they gather together to "ritually remember the passing of Francis of Assisi from this life into God", it "specifies the living memory of Francis", and "intensifies...commitment to follow Christ in the way of the poor man of Assisi.")

On the memorial page set up by members of his order, Groeschel's quote concerning his attitude about his death was given, "Saint Vincent de Paul said: 'If you love the poor, your life will be filled with sunlight, and you will not be frightened at the hour of death.' I wish to witness that this is true."

Groeschel's remains were placed in a simple pine casket (in accord with the rule of his community) and entombed in the crypt of the Most Blessed Sacrament Friary on October 12, 2014, following a funeral Mass at the Basilica Cathedral of the Sacred Heart in Newark, New Jersey.

== Books ==
- God and Us, Daughters of St. Paul, 1982
- Listening at Prayer, Paulist Press, 1984
- Spiritual Passages: The Psychology of Spiritual Development "for those who seek", Crossroad, 1984
- The Courage to be Chaste, Paulist Press, 1985. ISBN 978-0-8091-2705-4
- Stumbling Blocks or Stepping Stones: Spiritual Answers to Psychological Questions, Paulist Press, 1988
- Thy Will Be Done: A Spiritual Portrait of Terence Cardinal Cooke, Alba House, 1990
- The Reform of Renewal, Ignatius Press, 1990. ISBN 978-0-89870-286-6
- A Still Small Voice: A Practical Guide on Reported Revelations, Ignatius Press, 1993. ISBN 978-0-89870-436-5
- Healing the Original Wound: Reflections on the Full Meaning of Salvation, Servant, 1993
- Heaven in Our Hands: Living the Beatitudes, Servant, 1994
- Augustine: Major Writings (Crossroad Spiritual Legacy Series), Crossroad, 1995
- Arise From Darkness: What to Do When Life Doesn't Make Sense, Ignatius Press, 1995. ISBN 978-0-89870-525-6
- In the Presence of Our Lord, Our Sunday Visitor, 1997
- A Priest Forever: The Life of Eugene Hamilton, Our Sunday Visitor, 1998
- Praying In The Presence Of Our Lord: Prayers For Eucharistic Adoration, Our Sunday Visitor, 1999
- Quiet Moments: 120 Daily Readings, Servant, 2000
- The Journey Toward God, Servant, 2000
- The Cross at Ground Zero, Our Sunday Visitor, 2001
- Behold, He Comes: Meditations on the Incarnation, Servant, 2001 ISBN 1569553157
- From Scandal to Hope, Our Sunday Visitor, 2002
- The King, Crucified And Risen: On The Passion And Glory Of Christ, Servant, 2002
- Rosary: The Chain of Hope, Ignatius Press, 2003. ISBN 978-0-89870-983-4
- There Are No Accidents: In All Things Trust in God, Our Sunday Visitor, 2004
- Praying To Our Lord Jesus Christ: Prayers and Meditations Through the Centuries, Ignatius Press, 2004. ISBN 978-1-58617-041-7
- A Drama of Reform, Ignatius Press, 2005. ISBN 978-1-58617-114-8
- The Virtue Driven Life, Our Sunday Visitor, 2006
- Praying with the Creed: Meditations from the Oratory, Our Sunday Visitor, 2007
- Questions and Answers About Your Journey to God, Our Sunday Visitor, 2007
- Everyday Encounters with God: What Our Experiences Teach Us about the Divine, Word Among Us, 2008
- Experiencing the Mystery of Christ: Meditations from Oratory, Our Sunday Visitor, 2008
- The Journey of Faith: How to Deepen Your Faith in God, Christ, and the Church, Our Sunday Visitor, 2009
- Tears of God, Ignatius Press, 2009
- After This Life: What Catholics Believe About What Happens Next, Our Sunday Visitor, 2009
- Praying Constantly: Bringing Your Faith to Life, Our Sunday Visitor, 2010
- Travelers Along the Way: The Men and Women Who Shaped My Life, Servant, 2010
- I am with You Always, Ignatius Press, 2010. ISBN 978-1-58617-257-2
- The Saints in My Life: My Favorite Spiritual Companions, Our Sunday Visitor, 2011
- Jesus and Mary: In Praise of Their Glorious Names, Our Sunday Visitor, 2012

== Audio recordings ==
Groeschel made many audio recordings. Among them are two rosary recordings with the singer-songwriter Simonetta that have been on Catholic radio for more than a decade:

- The Rosary is a Place, The Saint Philomena Foundation, 2002
- The Rosary is a Luminous Place, The Saint Philomena Foundation, 2004
