= John Michael Fearns =

American clergyman (1897–1977)

His Excellency, The Most Reverend John Michael Fearns
- Auxiliary Bishop of New York; Titular Bishop of Geras
- In office: 1957-1972

Orders
- Ordination: February 19, 1922
- Consecration: December 10, 1958 by Cardinal Francis Spellman

Personal details
- Born: June 25, 1897 New York City, US
- Died: July 4, 1977 (aged 80) New York City
- Denomination: Roman Catholic
- Education: Cathedral College; University of the Propaganda; Pontifical Gregorian University
- Alma mater: St. Joseph's Seminary
- Motto: Non excedit (It is not expedient)

John Michael Fearns (June 25, 1897 – July 4, 1977) was an American prelate of the Roman Catholic Church. He served as an auxiliary bishop of the Archdiocese of New York from 1957 to 1972.

== Biography ==
=== Early life ===
John Fearns was born on June 25, 1897, in New York City, and received his early education at Cathedral College in Queens, New York. Deciding to become a priest, Fearns entered St. Joseph's Seminary in Yonkers, New York.

Fearns then travelled to Rome to reside at the Pontifical North American College while continuing his studies. He earned a Doctor of Sacred Theology degree after attending the University of the Propaganda and the Pontifical Gregorian University in Rome.

=== Priesthood ===
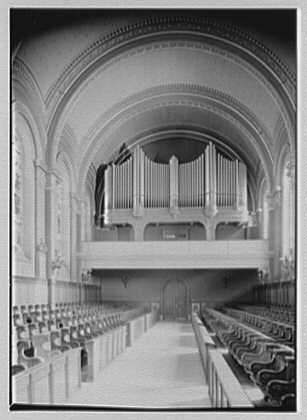
St. Joseph's Seminary, Yonkers, New York (1943)

Fearns was ordained to the priesthood in Rome by Cardinal Basilio Pompilj on February 19, 1922. After his 1922 ordination, the archdiocese assigned Fearns as curate at parishes in New Rochelle, Rye, and St. Clare's School in Mount Hope.

Fearns was appointed as a professor of moral theology and canon law at St. Joseph's Seminary in 1930. In 1940, he was named as rector of St. Joseph's. Fearns served as rector until 1956, when he was named pastor of St. Francis de Sales Church in Manhattan.

=== Auxiliary Bishop of New York ===
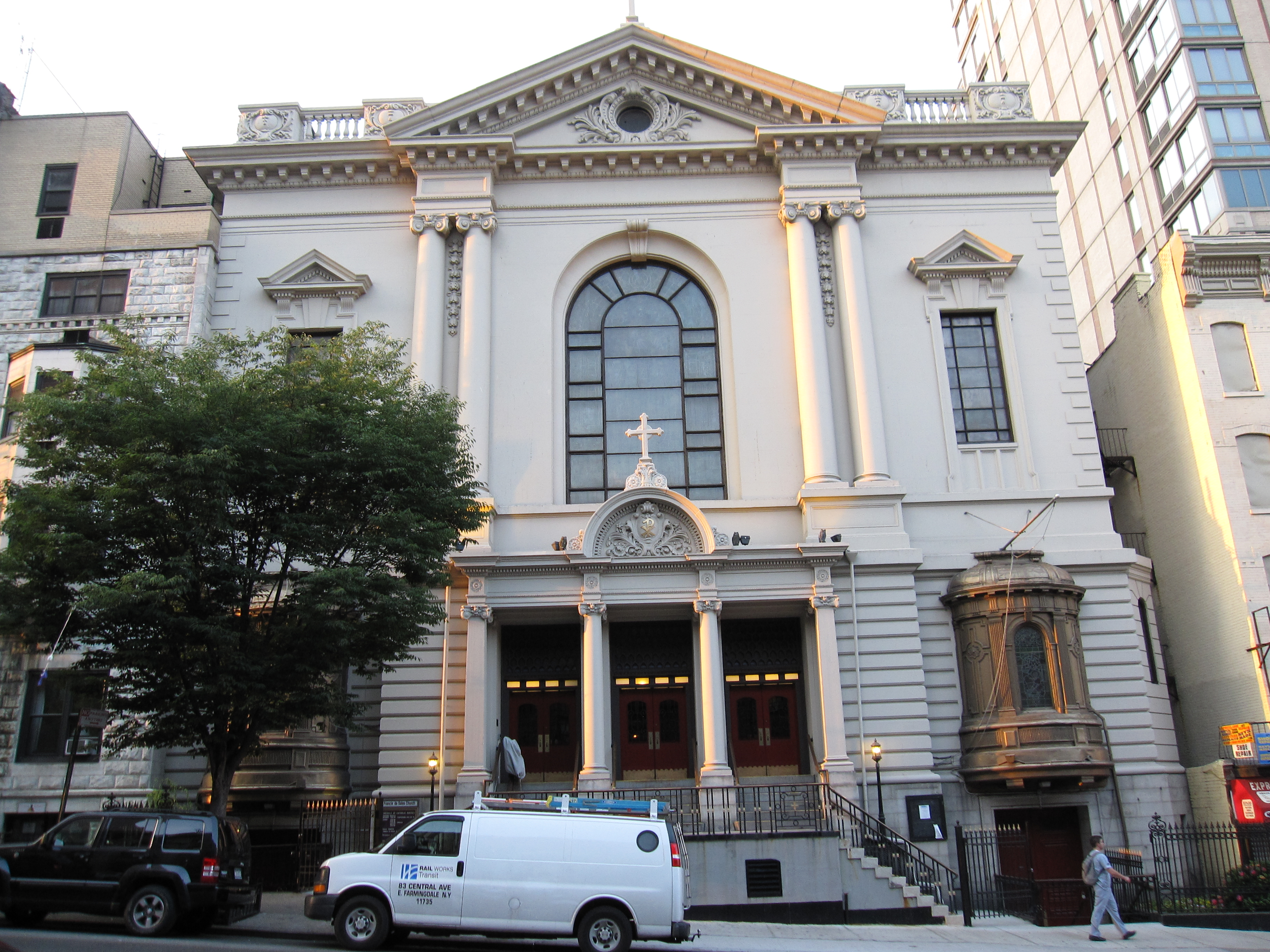
Saint Francis de Sales Church, New York City (2010)

On November 4, 1957, Fearns was appointed auxiliary bishop of New York and titular bishop of Geras by Pope Pius XII. He received his episcopal consecration on December 10, 1957 from Cardinal Francis Spellman, with Archbishop Patrick O'Boyle and Bishop Edward Maginn serving as co-consecrators, at St. Patrick's Cathedral in Manhattan.

At his consecration, Fearns wore the same vestments worn by Spellman and Pius XII at their own consecrations. While continuing to serve as pastor at St. Francis, Fearns' duties included administrative affairs, presiding at confirmation and ordination ceremonies, and visitation.

In 1961, Fearn declared in a homily it would be immoral for any country, including the United States, to conduct atmospheric nuclear tests merely as a show of force to its enemies. He stated,

"The justification of a given test depends on the importance of the new knowledge or practice that the test is expected to supply, balanced against the damage that the test will probably cause."

Between 1962 and 1965, Fearns attended all four sessions of the Second Vatican Council in Rome. In 1966, Spellman named Fearns to the newly created office of Episcopal Vicar for Orange and Rockland Counties. In an administrative innovation that resulted from the Second Vatican Council, he was one of six bishops appointed to devote more attention to the needs of local churches throughout the archdiocese In a move towards decentralization, the bishops were given authority to rule on issues such as the undertaking of interfaith activities with non-Catholic churches that had before been the prerogative of the archbishop's office. Fearns later served as pastor of St. Patrick's Parish in Newburgh, New York, until his retirement on August 12, 1972.

=== Death and legacy ===
Fearns died on July 4, 1977, at St. Vincent's Hospital in Manhattan after a long illness, at age 80.

Catholic Church titles
Preceded by –	Auxiliary Bishop of New York; 1957–1972	Succeeded by –
