= St. Joseph's Seminary and College =

Major seminary of the Archdiocese of New York

- Type: Seminary
- Established: 1896
- Affiliations: Roman Catholic Archdiocese of New York
- Location: Yonkers, New York, U.S. 40°55′52″N 73°51′51″W
- Website: www.dunwoodie.edu

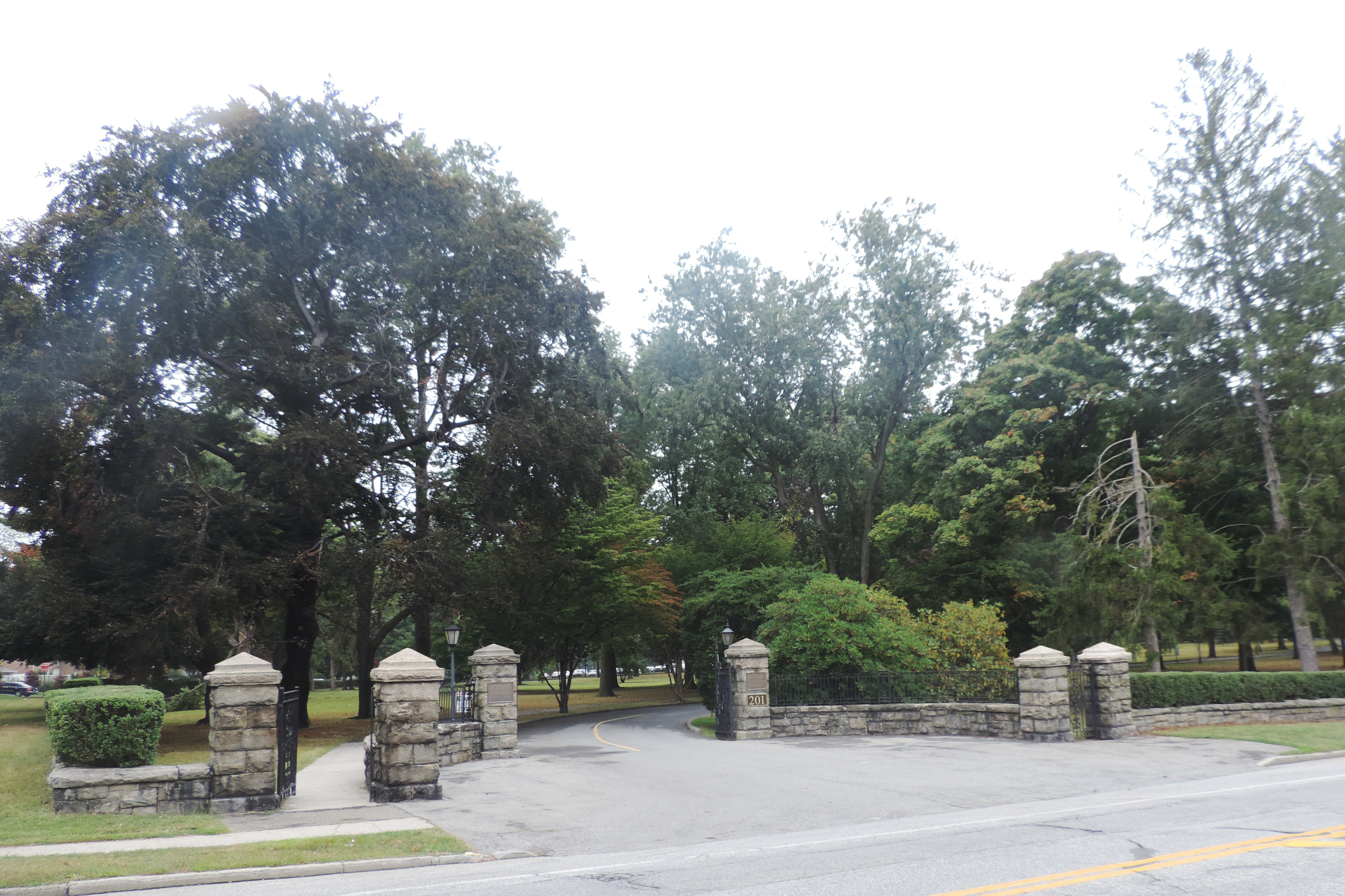
Campus entrance

St. Joseph's Seminary and College, sometimes referred to as Dunwoodie after the Dunwoodie neighborhood of Yonkers, New York in which it is located, is the major seminary of the Archdiocese of New York. Since 2012, it has also been the major seminary for the Diocese of Brooklyn and the Diocese of Rockville Centre.

The seminary is about 16 miles north of the Cathedral of Saint Patrick in midtown Manhattan, the seat of the Archbishop of New York.

Its primary mission is to form men for the priesthood in the Catholic Church, whether in dioceses in the United States or abroad. The seminary also serves as the major seminary for the Community of the Franciscan Friars of the Renewal, who study alongside the diocesan seminarians, but live off campus at a friary in Yonkers.

It is accredited as a college through the Middle States Commission on Higher Education and as a seminary by the Pontifical University of St. Thomas Aquinas, also known as the Angelicum, in Rome. It offers the degrees of Bachelor of Sacred Theology, Master of Divinity and Master of Arts.

== History ==
The Archdiocese of New York had operated a seminary at Fordham, once affiliated with what is now Fordham University, staffed by diocesan and, later, Jesuit priests.

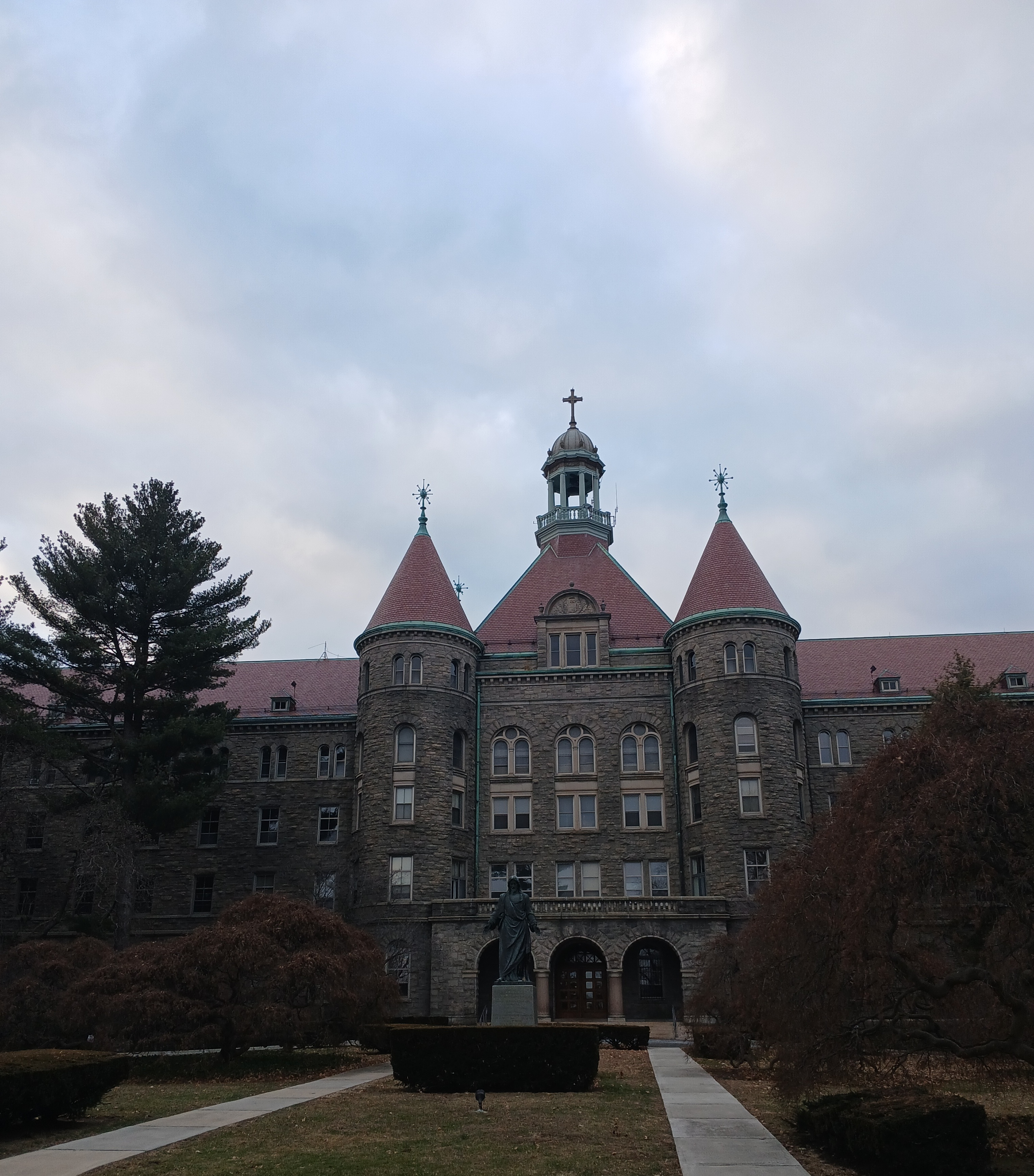
The main building of St. Joseph's Seminary and College at Dunwoodie, Yonkers

In 1864 Archbishop McCloskey established St. Joseph's Provincial Seminary in Troy, New York.

In 1896, under Archbishop Michael Corrigan, the seminary was transferred to Yonkers under the charge of the Sulpicians. Originally it was staffed by Sulpicians and diocesan priests.

The Seminary hosted Pope John Paul II in 1995 and Pope Benedict XVI on April 19, 2008. They each led an afternoon prayer service and visited with the seminarians. Pope Benedict also held a rally for youth in the Archdiocese.

On April 4, 2019, the Seminary hosted the incorruptible heart relic of St. Jean Vianney, the patron saint of parish priests. The relic was venerated by more than 2,000 people while it was at the seminary.

== Seminary formation and intellectual life ==
The seminary's primary mission is to educate men studying for the priesthood. Besides four years of academic work, students are required to take part in charitable activities. Seminarians pray together three times a day, at morning and evening prayers and at Mass.

In addition to offering the degrees of M.Div., S.T.B., and M.A., the seminary, through its various chairs, hosts visiting scholars throughout the academic year. Seminarians are given the opportunity to take part in interreligious discussions with students of non-Catholic seminaries of the metropolitan area.

The Dunwoodie Review was published by the seminary bi-annually from 1961 until 1974.

== Other archdiocesan functions ==
The seminary's main building also hosts monthly pre-Cana conferences for those preparing for the sacrament of Matrimony. One of the archdiocesan tribunals and the studio of ITV for schools is also located on the campus.

Throughout the year, both days of prayer and days of further education are scheduled for the clergy of the archdiocese.

== Faculty ==
=== Rectors ===
- Edward R. Dyer, S.S. 1896–1902
- James F. Driscoll, S.S 1902–1909
- John P. Chidwick 1909–1922
- James T. McEntyre 1922–1930
- Arthur J. Scanlan 1931–1940
- John Michael Fearns 1940–1956
- Charles O'C. Sloane 1956–1958
- Francis Frederick Reh 1958–1962
- Thomas A. Donnellan 1962–1964
- Edwin B. Broderick 1964–1968
- Edward J. Montano 1968–1973
- Austin B. Vaughan 1973–1979
- John J. Mescall 1979–1982
- Edward M. Connors 1982–1985
- Edwin F. O'Brien 1985–1989
- Raymond T. Powers 1990–1994
- Edwin F. O'Brien
- Francis J. McAree 1997–2001
- Peter G. Finn 2001–2007
- Gerald Thomas Walsh 2007–2012
- Peter Ignatius Vaccari 2012–2019
- James Massa 2020–Present

=== Notable faculty ===
- Lorenzo Albacete
- Sara Butler, M.S.B.T. (2001–2009)
- Joseph Augustine Di Noia, O.P. (2004–2005)
- Francis P. Duffy
- Benedict Groeschel, C.F.R.
- J. M. Lelen
- William Bartley Smith (1971–2009)

== Notable alumni ==
- Charles John Brown — Archbishop, Papal Nuncio to the Philippines (2020–present)
- Terence Cooke — Cardinal (from 1969), Archbishop of New York (1968–1983)
- Stan Fortuna — priest of the Community of Franciscan Friars of the Renewal, musician
- Philip Joseph Furlong — Auxiliary Bishop of the United States Military Vicariate (1956–1971)
- William Lombardy — World Junior Chess Champion (1957), tutor to World Chess Champion Bobby Fischer, priest (1967–1980)
- Henry J. Mansell — Archbishop of Hartford, Connecticut (2003–2013)
- Theodore Edgar McCarrick — Cardinal (2001–2018), Archbishop of Washington (2001–2006)
- Timothy A. McDonnell — Bishop of Springfield, Massachusetts (2004–2014)
- James Francis McIntyre — Cardinal (from 1953), Archbishop of Los Angeles (1948–1970)
- John P. Meier — priest of New York, professor of Scripture at the University of Notre Dame
- John Joseph Mitty — Archbishop of San Francisco (1935–1961)
- Patrick Aloysius O'Boyle — Cardinal (from 1967), Archbishop of Washington (1947–1973)
- Edwin Frederick O'Brien — Cardinal (from 2012), Archbishop of Baltimore (2007–2011)
- Frank Pavone — priest (until December 2022), Director of Priests for Life, founder of Missionaries of the Gospel of Life
- Dennis Joseph Sullivan — Bishop of the Diocese of Camden, New Jersey (2013–2025)
- David Tracy — Catholic theologian, University of Chicago Divinity School professor (1969–2008)

== Sources ==
- Shelley, Thomas J. Dunwoodie. Christian Classics Inc.: Westminster, Maryland, 1993.
