= Terence Cooke =

Catholic cardinal (1921–1983)

Servant of God Terence James Cooke
- Cardinal, Archbishop of New York
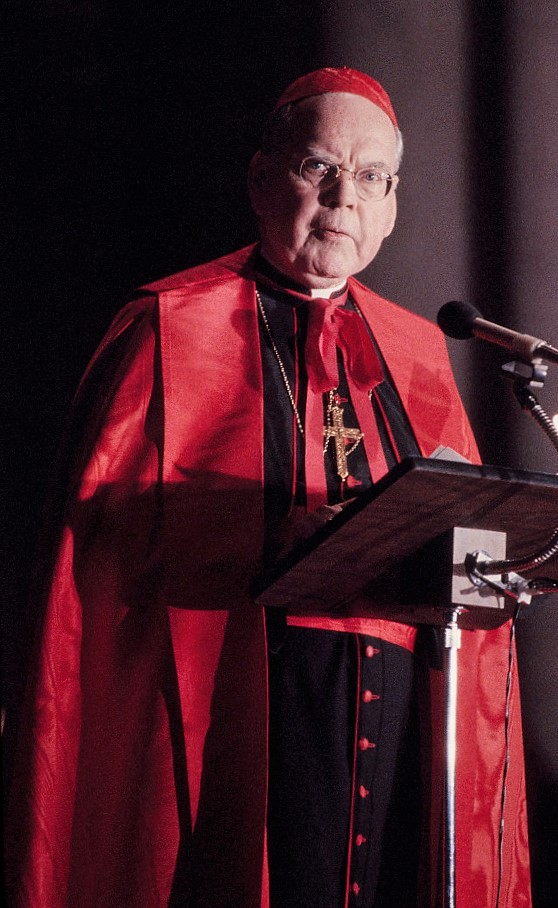
- Cooke in 1983
- Church: Catholic Church
- See: New York
- Appointed: March 2, 1968
- Installed: April 4, 1968
- Term ended: October 6, 1983
- Predecessor: Francis Spellman
- Successor: John Joseph O'Connor
- Other posts: Cardinal-Priest of Ss. Giovanni e Paolo; Vicar Apostolic for the United States Armed Forces
- Previous post: Auxiliary Bishop of New York (1965–1968)

Orders
- Ordination: December 1, 1945 by Francis Spellman
- Consecration: December 13, 1965 by Francis Spellman
- Created cardinal: April 28, 1969 by Pope Paul VI
- Rank: Cardinal-Priest

Personal details
- Born: March 1, 1921 Manhattan, New York, U.S.
- Died: October 6, 1983 (aged 62) Manhattan, New York, U.S.
- Buried: St. Patrick's Cathedral (New York)
- Parents: Michael Cooke and Margaret Gannon
- Motto: Fiat Voluntas Tua (Thy Will Be Done)

Ordination history
History
Episcopal consecration
- Consecrated by: Francis Spellman
- Date: December 13, 1965
Episcopal succession
Bishops consecrated by Terence Cooke as principal consecrator
- Martin Joseph Neylon, S.J.: February 2, 1970
- Patrick Vincent Ahern: March 19, 1970
- Edward Dennis Head: March 19, 1970
- James Patrick Mahoney: September 15, 1972
- Anthony Francis Mestice: March 5, 1973
- James Jerome Killeen: December 13, 1975
- Howard James Hubbard: March 27, 1977
- Theodore Edgar McCarrick: June 29, 1977
- Austin Bernard Vaughan: June 29, 1977
- Francisco Garmendia: June 29, 1977
- Joseph Thomas O'Keefe: September 8, 1982
- Emerson John Moore: September 8, 1982
- Joseph Thomas Dimino: May 10, 1983
- Francis Xavier Roque: May 10, 1983
- Lawrence Joyce Kenney: May 10, 1983

Styles of Terence Cooke
- Reference style: His Eminence
- Spoken style: Your Eminence
- Informal style: Cardinal

Terence James Cooke (March 1, 1921 – October 6, 1983) was an American Catholic prelate who served as Archbishop of New York from 1968 until his death, quietly battling leukemia throughout his tenure. He was named a cardinal in 1969. Cooke previously served as an auxiliary bishop of the Archdiocese of New York from 1965 to 1967.

Nine years after his death, Cooke was designated a Servant of God, the first step in the process that may lead to beatification and then canonization as a saint.

== Biography ==
=== Early life ===
The youngest of three children, Terence Cooke was born in New York City to Michael and Margaret (née Gannon) Cooke. His parents were both from County Galway, Ireland, and named their son after Terence MacSwiney, the Lord Mayor of Cork who died on a hunger strike during the Irish War of Independence. Michael Cooke worked as a chauffeur and construction worker. At age five, Terence and his family moved from Morningside Heights, Manhattan, to the northeast Bronx. Following his mother's death in 1930, his aunt Mary Gannon helped raise him and his siblings.

After expressing an early interest in the priesthood, in 1934 Cooke entered Manhattan's Cathedral College, the minor seminary of the Archdiocese of New York. In 1940, he entered St. Joseph's Seminary in Yonkers, New York.

=== Ministry ===
Cooke was ordained a priest by Archbishop Francis Spellman on December 1, 1945. Cooke then served as chaplain for St. Agatha's Home for Children in Nanuet, New York, until 1947, when he moved to Washington, D.C., to pursue graduate studies at The Catholic University of America. He obtained a Master of Social Work degree in 1949.

When he returned to New York, Cooke was assigned to serve as a curate at St. Athanasius Parish in the Bronx, while working with the Catholic Youth Organization. In 1954 he was appointed executive director of the Youth Division of Catholic Charities and procurator of St. Joseph's Seminary. In 1957 he was appointed by Cardinal Spellman to be his secretary, a position he held until 1965. Cooke was named a monsignor on August 13, 1957, and vice-chancellor for the archdiocese in 1958, rising to full chancellor in 1961.

=== Auxiliary Bishop of New York ===
On September 15, 1965, Pope Paul VI appointed Cooke as an auxiliary bishop of the Archdiocese of New York and titular bishop of Summa. He received his episcopal consecration on December 13, 1965, from Cardinal Spellman at St. Patrick's Cathedral, with Archbishops Joseph McGucken and John Maguire serving as co-consecrators. Cooke selected as his episcopal motto: Fiat Voluntas Tua, meaning, "Thy Will Be Done" from Luke 1:38.

Cooke played a prominent role in arranging Pope Paul's visit to New York in October 1965, and became Vicar General of the Archdiocese two days after his consecration, on December 15, 1965. He was diagnosed with acute myelomonocytic leukemia, a form of cancer, that year as well.

=== Archbishop of New York ===
Following Spellman's death in December 1967, Pope Paul named Cooke as the seventh Archbishop of New York on March 2, 1968.

Pope Paul's selection of Cooke came as a surprise; likely contenders for the post included Fulton J. Sheen, a television personality and Bishop of Rochester; and Archbishop Maguire, who had been Spellman's coadjutor. In addition to his duties in New York, Cooke was named Vicar Apostolic for the U.S. Military on April 4, 1968, and was installed in both positions at St. Patrick's Cathedral.

That same day as Cooke's installation, the Reverend Martin Luther King Jr. was assassinated in Memphis, Tennessee, leading to a nationwide wave of riots in more than 100 cities. Cooke went to Harlem that evening to plead for racial peace and later attended King's funeral. After the assassination of Attorney General Robert F. Kennedy on June 6, 1968, Cooke led the funeral at St. Patrick's Cathedral; months later, he baptized Kennedy's youngest child, Rory Kennedy.

On January 20, 1969, Cooke delivered the benediction at the inauguration of President Richard Nixon.

After the first meeting between Church and Freemasonry, which had been held on April 11, 1969, at the convent of the Divine Master in Ariccia, he was the protagonist of a series of public handshakes between high prelates of the Roman Catholic Church and the heads of Freemasonry.

Cooke helped implement the reforms of the Second Vatican Council in the archdiocese, and adopted a more collegial management style than his predecessor Spellman. Pope Paul VI appointed him as Cardinal-Priest of Santi Giovanni e Paolo, Rome (the traditional titular church of the New York archbishops starting in 1946) in the consistory of April 28, 1969. At the time of his elevation, Cooke was the second-youngest member of the College of Cardinals after Cardinal Alfred Bengsch, who was six months younger. Cooke was theologically conservative but described himself as progressive in secular matters.

During his tenure as archbishop, Cooke founded the Birthright organization, which provides counseling and other support for pregnant women; the Inner-City Scholarship Fund, which provides financial aid for Catholic-school students; an Archdiocesan Housing Development Program, providing housing to New York's disadvantaged; Catholic New York, the archdiocesan newspaper; and nine nursing homes. In 1974, Cooke went to the Pontifical North American College in Rome, where he attended lectures on the Second Vatican Council given by his future successor, Father Edward Egan.

Cooke was one of the cardinal electors who participated in the conclaves of August and October 1978, which selected Popes John Paul I and John Paul II, respectively. In 1979, Cooke separately hosted the Dalai Lama and Pope John Paul II at St. Patrick's Cathedral.

=== Death ===
Cooke's leukemia, first diagnosed in 1965, was deemed terminal in 1975, and he was on almost constant chemotherapy for the last five years of his life. In late August 1983, he announced his illness to the public, saying that he was expected to live for a few more months but would not resign his post. In an open letter completed only days before his death, he wrote, "The gift of life, God's special gift, is no less beautiful when it is accompanied by illness or weakness, hunger or poverty, mental or physical handicaps, loneliness or old age."

On October 6, 1983, Cooke died from leukemia at age 62 at his episcopal residence in Manhattan, New York City. He is interred in the crypt under the altar of St. Patrick's Cathedral.

== Legacy ==
On April 5, 1984, President Ronald Reagan posthumously awarded Cooke the Presidential Medal of Freedom. In 1988, he posthumously received the F. Sadlier Dinger Award from the publisher William H. Sadlier, Inc., for his contributions to religious education.

=== Recognition ===
During his years as archbishop, Cooke received honorary degrees from at least four Catholic colleges: College of New Rochelle (1968), College of Mount Saint Vincent (1968), Boston College (1969), and Marymount Manhattan College (1978). He also received the James Cardinal Gibbons Medal (1979) from his alma mater, Catholic University of America.

At least seven buildings in the Archdiocese of New York have been named in his honor:

- Terence Cardinal Cooke Catholic Center (archdiocesan headquarters, in Manhattan)
- Terence Cardinal Cooke–Cathedral Library (now part of New York Public Library, Manhattan)
- Terence Cardinal Cooke Health Care Center (Manhattan)
- Cooke School and Institute (special needs, Manhattan)
- Cardinal Cooke Residence (special needs, Bronx)
- Cardinal Cooke Residence (emergency home for mothers, Spring Valley)
- Cardinal Cooke Center (parish hall, Staten Island)

=== Beatification process ===
Soon after Cooke died in 1983, a movement emerged to open a beatification process. In 1984, with the support of Cooke's successor, Archbishop (and future cardinal) John O'Connor, the Cardinal Cooke Guild was established. In 1992, the Congregation for the Causes of Saints officially designated Cooke as a Servant of God. On April 14, 2010, the Guild and senior American clergy presented Pope Benedict XVI with the positio, the documentation of the cardinal's life, work, and virtues. The document was then filed with the Congregation for Causes, to be examined by theologians.

Benedict Groeschel was the postulator for the cause while it was in its initial stages in New York. After the process was accepted by the Holy See, Andrea Ambrosi served as postulator until his retirement in 2021. He was replaced by Angelica Ambrosi.

== Views ==
=== Foreign relations ===
An anti-Communist, Cooke opposed the majority of his fellow bishops when he spoke out against nuclear disarmament in 1982. He once stated that deterrence was not satisfactory or safe, but could be considered morally "tolerable". During a 1968 Central Park anti-war rally by Coretta Scott King he organized a small counter demonstration in support of the Vietnam War.

Cooke, opposed to the militant policies of the Provisional Irish Republican Army, remained inside St. Patrick's Cathedral during the 1983 St. Patrick's Day Parade, until the grand marshal, Irish activist Michael Flannery, had passed by. Flannery was an outspoken supporter of the IRA.

=== Abortion ===
Cooke was an outspoken opponent of abortion, which he called the "slaughter of the innocent unborn", and once served as chairman of the USCCB's Pro-Life Committee.

=== LGBT rights ===
Cooke initiated the formation of Courage International, a ministry that promotes chastity for gay and lesbian Catholics.

=== Traditional values ===
Cooke supported the Cursillo Movement, Christian Family Movement, and Charismatic Renewal, and was instrumental in bringing the Missionaries of Charity to New York. Cooke once described actress-turned-princess Grace Kelly as "a lesson in Catholic motherhood".

Catholic Church titles
Preceded by See Created	Titular Bishop of Summa; 1965 – 1968	Succeeded by Daniel Liston, C.S.Sp
Preceded by Francis Spellman	Vicar Apostolic for the Military Services; 1968 – 1983	Succeeded by John Joseph Thomas Ryan
Preceded by Francis Spellman	Archbishop of New York; 1968 – 1983	Succeeded by John Joseph O'Connor
Preceded by Francis Spellman	Cardinal-Priest of Santi Giovanni e Paolo; 1969 – 1983	Succeeded by John Joseph O'Connor
