= Franciscan Friars of the Renewal =

Catholic clerical religious congregation founded in 1987

- Fratres Franciscani a Renovatione
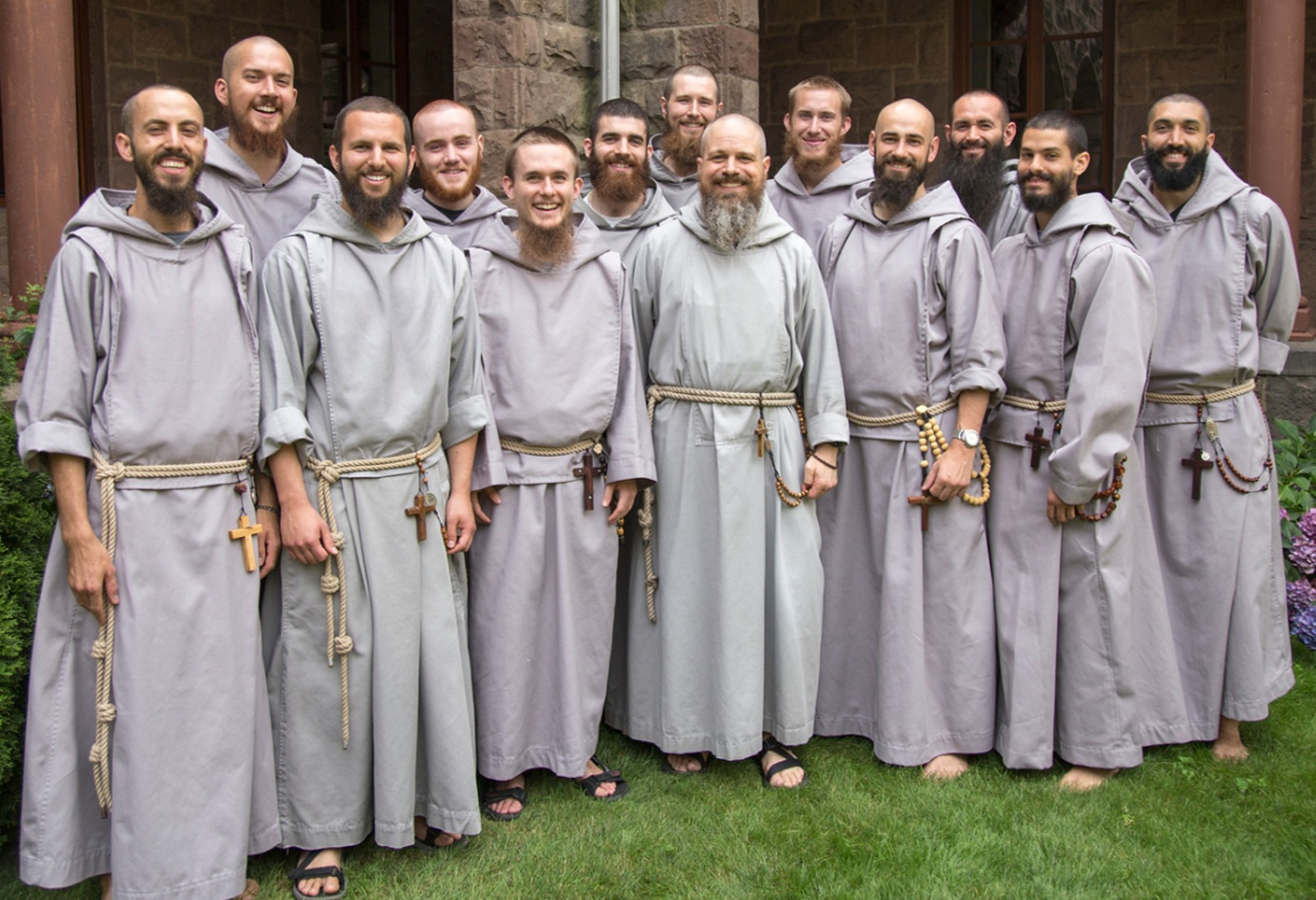
- Abbreviation: CFR
- Formation: April 28, 1987; 39 years ago
- Founders: Benedict Groeschel; Andrew Apostoli; Robert Stanion; Glenn Sudano; Stan Fortuna; Robert Lombardo; Joseph Nolan; Pio Mandato
- Founded at: New York City, United States
- Type: Clerical Religious Congregation of Pontifical Right (for Men)
- Members: 124 members (72 priests) (2022)
- Motto: 'The lost I will seek out; the strays I will bring back'
- Superior General: John Anthony Boughton, CFR
- Parent organization: Catholic Church
- Website: www.franciscanfriars.com

The Franciscan Friars of the Renewal (Latin: Fratres Franciscani a Renovatione; Abbreviation: CFR) is a Catholic clerical religious congregation of Pontifical Right for men founded in 1987. It follows the Capuchin Franciscan tradition.

Originally formed as a mendicant congregation in the Archdiocese of New York, it has been recognized under pontifical right since 2016. A parallel community known as the Franciscan Sisters of the Renewal was established in 1988.

== Foundation ==
The congregation was founded in 1987 by eight Capuchin priest friars, including Benedict Groeschel, Andrew Apostoli, Robert Stanion, Glenn Sudano, Stan Fortuna, Robert Lombardo, Joseph Nolan and Pio Mandato.

The purpose of the community is to strive for a return to the authentic Capuchin way of life and the renewal of the Catholic Church. In addition, the friars are known for their fidelity to the pope. The Community characterizes itself as Catholic, Franciscan, Capuchin, contemplative, prophetic, apostolic, fraternal and pro-life.

Sudano told a reporter about the motive behind forming the community: "We were concerned about the effects of secularism on religious life [among the Capuchins] and a lack of clear and explicit fidelity to the Church. That secularism is less prevalent today, thank God, but was very much the case in the 1970s and 80s. What we were observing then were not so much sins of commission, but omission. A pastor, for example, [might] not speak out against the Holy Father, but neither would he speak in support of him. He [wouldn't] condemn adoration of the Blessed Sacrament or the Rosary, but he [wouldn't] promote them either. We worried that many of the traditional expressions of the Faith were not appreciated or practiced."

Sudano said that it was their feeling that "Because of this secularism, men weren't attracted to life in religious communities. ...[Potential candidates] wanted to participate in the traditional forms of religious life, and wanted traditional signs, such as wearing the habit."

Initially it had not been their desire to break away from the Capuchins. Sudano related, "We recognized that things were not going well. Our desire was to stay in the Capuchin community, but to be a renewal community. We wanted to bring back adoration and traditional devotions and practices, such as wearing the habit. Our superior in Rome was interested in our idea, but the provincials in the United States were not. We were allowed to begin in New York, but after three years of fraternal discussions, it was clear that our order was not interested in our style. So, we decided to continue our work under the archbishop of New York. Leaving our community was not easy. We didn’t leave our confreres because we thought they were evil, but because we had a difference of opinion. Some of our confreres were upset with us, but leaving was something that had to be done."

== Apostolate ==
Their website states that the mission is twofold:

First "...is to serve the materially poor, most especially the destitute and homeless. Friaries not primarily focused on formation should have one or more facilities to provide for the needs of the poor, for example, a shelter, soup kitchen, food pantry and/or clothing room. Each of these works must be directed by a friar to preserve the Catholic and Franciscan character. Every member of the community is to be personally and directly involved in “hands on” work with the poor. All service to the poor is given completely free of charge."

Second is evangelisation "...through preaching and teaching the Holy Gospel, and by sharing the rich treasures of our Catholic faith with all. This can take many forms so that every friar may assist in his own way. Some expressions of this apostolate are: providing missionary centers for the poor, street evangelisation, parish missions, retreats, days of recollection, pilgrimages, spiritual direction, pastoral counselling, religious education and sacramental ministry."

== Religious habit and training ==
The friars wear a grey religious habit with a hood, a cord, and sandals. Beards are also characteristic for members of the congregation. The rope worn as a belt around the waist symbolises being girded with Christ and is tied in the three characteristic Franciscan knots which signify the vows of poverty, chastity and obedience which are taken upon becoming a member of the community.

Those interested in becoming members of the community go through various stages: postulancy lasting ten months, followed by a year-long novitiate after which simple vows are taken. The newly professed members then spend a year or more living in one of the friaries. Final vows (life-time) are not made until a person has been a member of the community for at least five years. Those who feel called to the ministerial priesthood pursue their studies at St. Joseph's Seminary in Yonkers; during this time, the students live in a nearby friary. Friars who become priests are typically ordained by the Archbishop of New York alongside priests from the Archdiocese of New York in St. Patrick's Cathedral.

== Membership ==
In 2019, the institute had 111 members, of whom 61 were priests. The institute has friars from various countries including the United States, Canada, Australia, South Korea, United Kingdom, Czechia, Poland and Ireland.

== History ==
In 1988, the Franciscan Sisters of the Renewal were established. They are based in the Bronx, New York City.

The group was established as a diocesan institute by Cardinal John O’Connor in 1999. The Franciscan Friars of the Renewal were involved in caring for victims of the September 11 attacks in Manhattan and ministering to first responders during the rescue and recovery mission. The following day, September 12, a group of friars walked along subway tunnels to reach Manhattan.

The friars appeared as extras in a scene on a subway car for the film Bella, which won the "People's Choice Award" at the Toronto International Film Festival in 2006.

In 2016, the friars were featured in a documentary titled Outcasts.

On June 13, 2016, João Cardinal Bráz de Aviz, Prefect of the Congregation for Institutes of Consecrated Life and Societies of Apostolic Life, and his secretary, José Rodríguez Carballo, OFM, signed a decree of recognition. On December 8, 2016, the group announced that Pope Francis officially recognized the Franciscan Friars of the Renewal as a religious institute of pontifical right, meaning that it will now depend immediately and exclusively on the Holy See in the matters of internal governance and discipline.

In November 2020, Bob Lombardo, one of the founders of the CFRs, was ordained a bishop and is serving as an auxiliary bishop in the Archdiocese of Chicago.
