= Robert J. Lombardo =

American Catholic bishop

His Excellency, The Most Reverend Robert Joseph Lombardo C.F.R.
- Auxiliary Bishop of Chicago; Titular Bishop of Munatiana
- See: Archdiocese of Chicago
- Appointed: September 11, 2020
- Installed: November 13, 2020
- Other post: Titular Bishop of Munatiana

Orders
- Ordination: May 12, 1990 by John O'Connor
- Consecration: November 13, 2020 by Blase J. Cupich, John R. Manz, and Joseph N. Perry

Personal details
- Born: September 4, 1957 (age 69) Stamford, Connecticut, US
- Education: University of Notre Dame; Maryknoll School of Theology
- Motto: My God and my all

Styles of Robert Joseph Lombardo
- Reference style: His Excellency; The Most Reverend
- Spoken style: Your Excellency
- Religious style: Bishop

Robert Joseph Lombardo, C.F.R. (born September 4, 1957) is an American Catholic prelate who has served as auxiliary bishop for the Archdiocese of Chicago in Illinois since 2020. He is a cofounder and member of the Franciscan Friars of the Renewal.

== Biography ==
=== Early life ===
Robert Lombardo was born on September 4, 1957, in Stamford, Connecticut. In 1961, he entered St. Maurice Parish primary school in Stamford, then in 1971 Stamford Catholic High School. In 1975, Lombardo enrolled at the University of Notre Dame in Notre Dame, Indiana, graduating with a Bachelor of Business Administration in accounting in 1979. From 1979 to 1980, he worked in public accountancy at Price Waterhouse.

By 1980, Lombardo had decided to join the Order of Friars Minor Capuchin. That same year, he started studying at the Greymoor Friary in Garrison, New York. Lombardo made his first vows to his religious order in 1981. The Capuchins sent him in 1984 to Bolivia and Honduras to work in parishes and with street kids. He returned to New York City in 1985 to assist with youth programs at Our Lady of Sorrows Parish in Manhattan.

Lombardo took his perpetual vows to the Capuchin Friars in 1986. He joined the Franciscan Friars Preaching Team in 1987, remaining with them for 14 years. That same year, he was appointed director of the Padre Pio Shelter for the Homeless in the Bronx borough of New York City and received a Master of Divinity degree from the Maryknoll School of Theology in Ossining, New York. In 1987, Lombardo co-founded the CFR, a new religious order, in New York.

=== Priesthood ===
Lombardo was ordained a priest for the Franciscan Friars of the Renewal on May 12, 1990, by Cardinal John O'Connor at St. Patrick's Cathedral in New York. After his ordination, Lombardo held the following positions in New York City:

- Founder and director of Saint Anthony Residence (1990–2004)
- Director of Saint Anthony Shelter in Bronx (1993–2004);
- Director of Saint Anthony Free Dental/Medical Clinic in Bronx (1998–2004);
- Vicar of the community (1999–2004).

In 2004, at the request of Cardinal Francis George, Lombardo moved to Illinois to establish a mission church in one of the poorest neighborhoods of Chicago. Lombardo served as:

- Director of Our Lady of the Angels Mission Center in Chicago (since 2005)
- Member of the Coalition for the Homeless in Chicago (2008–2010)
- Member of the Institute on Religious Life in Libertyville, Illinois (2010)

In 2010, Lombardo founded the community of the Franciscans of the Eucharist of Chicago. In 2015, Cardinal Blase Cupich named Lombardo as vicar forane of Deanery III-A in the archdiocese.

=== Auxiliary Bishop of Chicago ===
Pope Francis appointed Lombardo as titular bishop of Munatiana and auxiliary bishop for the Archdiocese of Chicago on September 11, 2020. On November 13, 2020, Lombardo was consecrated by Cardinal Blase Cupich at Holy Name Cathedral in Chicago.

== See also ==
- Catholic Church hierarchy
- Catholic Church in the United States
- Historical list of the Catholic bishops of the United States
- List of Catholic bishops of the United States
- Lists of patriarchs, archbishops, and bishops

== Episcopal succession ==
Catholic Church titles
Preceded by -	Auxiliary Bishop of Chicago; 2020-Present	Succeeded by -
