= Stan Fortuna =

American Catholic priest (born 1957)

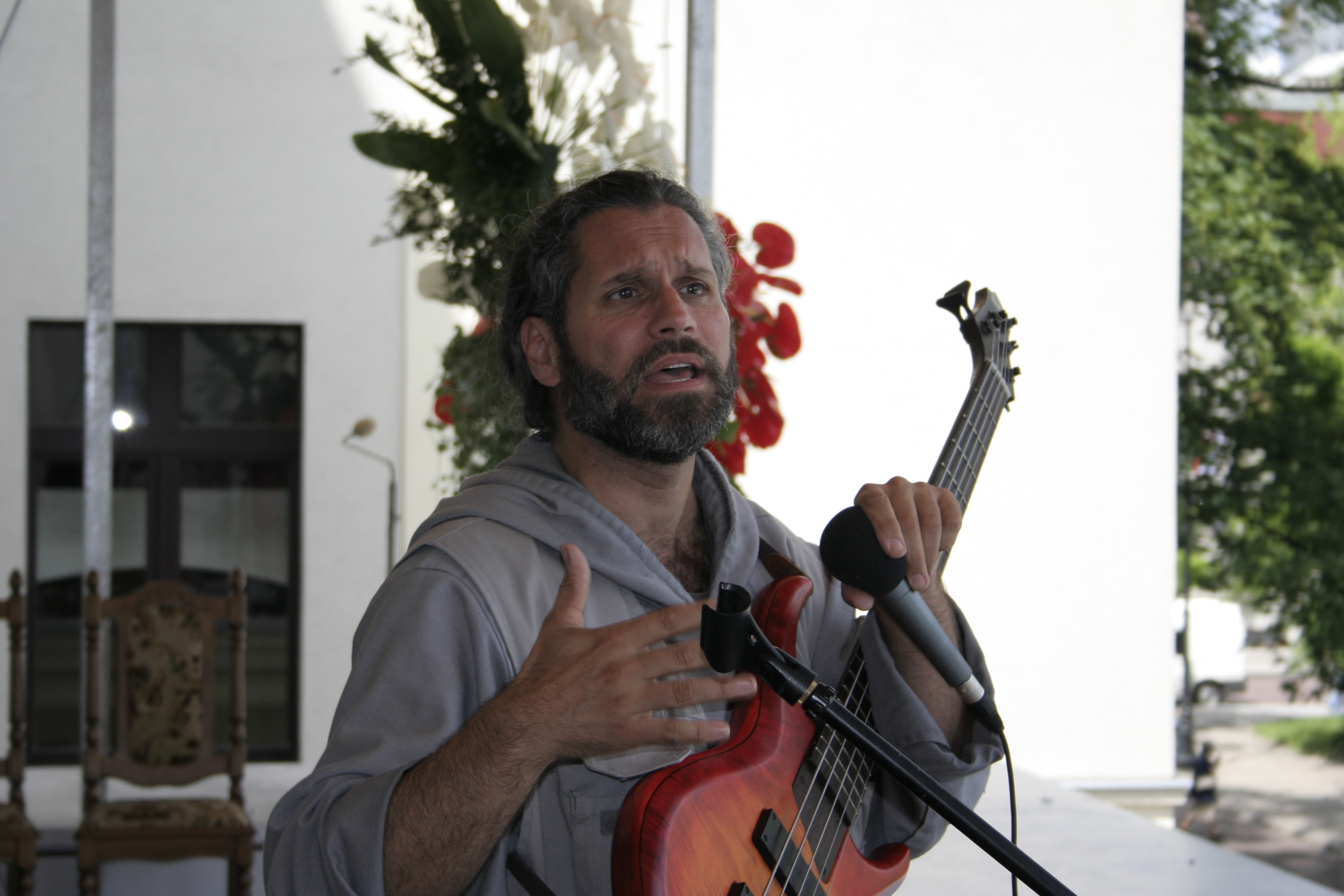
Father Stan preaching in 2006

Stan Fortuna, CFR (born June 9, 1957) is an American Catholic priest known for his musical contributions in various genres, primarily Catholic-based jazz and hip hop.

== Biography ==
Fortuna, a U.S. citizen of Italian and Greek descent, has been passionate about music since his early years. In second grade, he received an electric guitar as a Christmas gift and started playing improvisational sessions in and around New York City. Fortuna trained under renowned jazz artist Lennie Tristano, and played bass professionally before dedicating himself to the priesthood.

== Career ==
Fortuna is one of the eight original members of the Community of Franciscan Friars of the Renewal, a Franciscan order established by Cardinal John Joseph O'Connor in 1987. Father Stan was ordained as a priest in the Bronx in 1990.

Father Fortuna established the non-profit Francesco Productions in 1987 as a means to record and distribute evangelical music, video productions and books, as well as handle his speaking and concert engagements; all proceeds benefit the Community's work with the poor of the South Bronx where he lives. Francesco International Love Outreach was later started to assist in working with the poverty-stricken outside of the US, including the underprivileged in Uganda and Poland.

Father Fortuna has been a featured presenter at numerous Franciscan youth conferences like Steubenville, and has numerous appearances to his credit on the EWTN program, Life on the Rock. He frequently performs and lectures in the United States and countries in Europe and Africa. His work and music have garnered articles in a number of publications including the U.S. hip hop magazine XXL and in the New York press; he has also appeared on Entertainment Tonight Canada and MuchMusic's "Popoganda".

Father Fortuna has released over 18 CDs in a variety of musical genres. His latest rap CD is Sacro Song 3: The Completion of the Trilogy, and "Seraphic Wanderer", containing a variety of musical styles and released in 2009, is dedicated to his mother. He has also released a jazz CD through Universal Music with his trio, Scola Tristano. He has written four books U Got 2 Believe, U Got 2 Pray and U Got 2 Love - published by OSV - as well as "Fortuna Flow: poetry volume i". He is currently at work on his next book about the late Pope Francis (2025).

A documentary on his life and work entitled Sent has been produced. His third inspirational book U Got 2 Love was released in December 2009 followed by a book of his poetry combined with his photography, Fortuna Flow: poetry volume i, published in 2021.

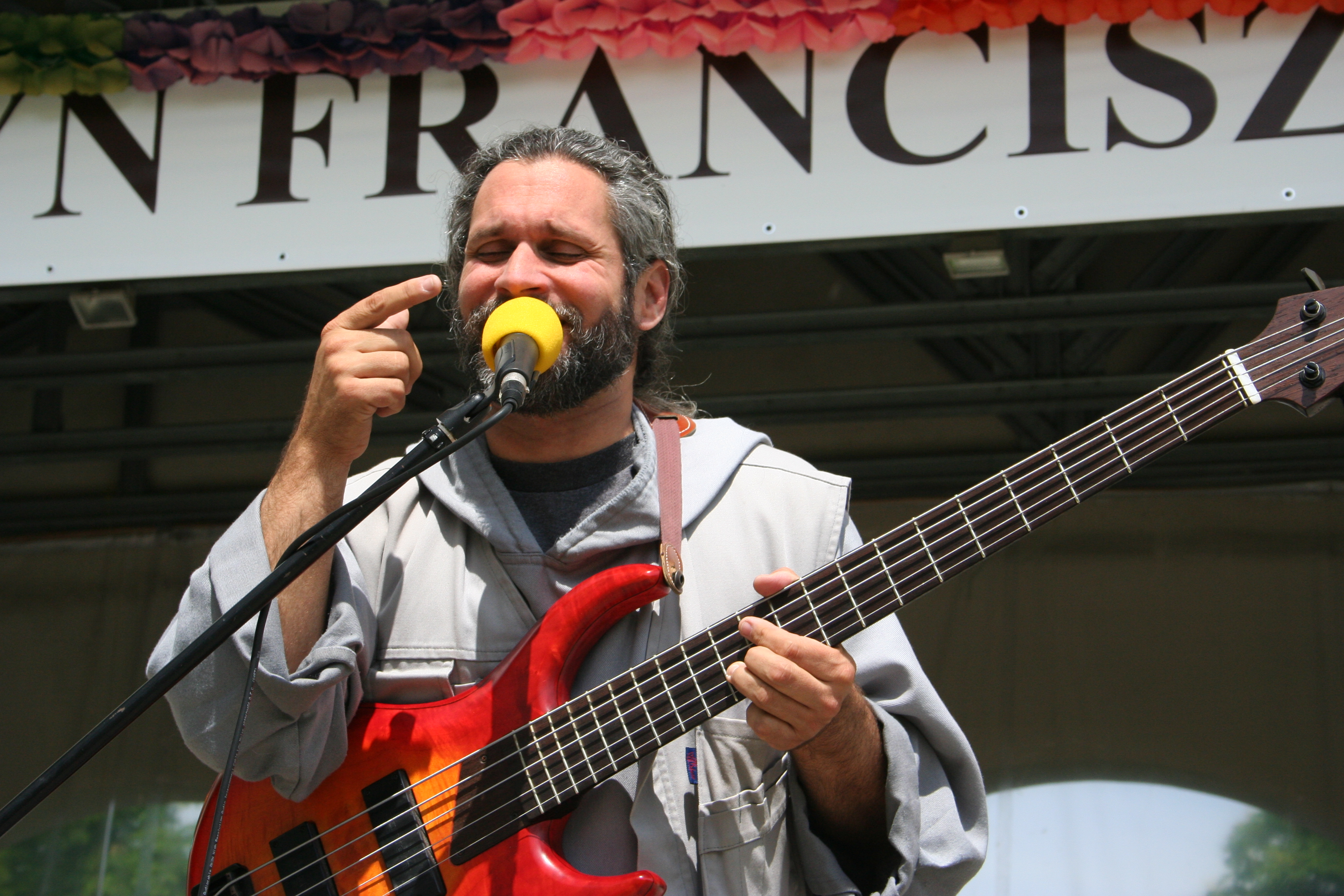
Father Stan during performance

Among his most memorable songs are Everybody Got 2 Suffer and Cell 91 from the album Sacro Song II.

Father Fortuna spends most of his time preaching and doing concerts in the United States, Canada, Africa and Europe. During 2008 he performed at World Youth Day, Australia, participated in an international conference at the Divine Retreat Center in India and was keynote speaker at the Diocesan Youth Conference in Victoria, British Columbia. In 2025, he continues to perform concerts, to speak at retreats and missions as well as lead an annual pilgrimage to Poland and Rome, following in the footsteps of St. John Paul II.

== Discography ==
=== Albums ===
- Surrender To Stillness (1994)
- Take My Heart (1995)
- First Collection (1996)
- Loved By You (1997)
- Fr. Stan Live - The Spirit of the Lord and the Art of Improvising [Live] (1998)
- Traditional Catholic Hymns (1999)
- Second Collection (2000)
- I Will Worship You (2000)
- I Hear You Got Plans / Do You Love Me? [Single] (2000)
- Sacro Song (1998)
- Sacro Song II (2002)
- Scola Tristano
- New Culture Concert Live in New York Jazz
- The Great One
- Christmas Culture: Sacred & Secular
- Brazilian Collection
- Adoration (2003)
- Sacro Song 3: The Completion of the Trilogy (2006)
- Seraphic Wanderer (2009)
- Renewal (2012)
- Word World: Poetic Invasion (2014)
- I Will Sing (2017)
- Spirit Of Christmas (1988)

== Bibliography ==
=== Books ===
- U Got 2 Believe (2001)
- U Got 2 Pray: 100 Prayers for Daily Living in Modern Culture (2004)
- U Got 2 Love (2009)
- Fortuna Flow: poetry volume i (2021)
