= Dunwoodie, Yonkers =

Coordinates: 40.9376°N 73.8627°W

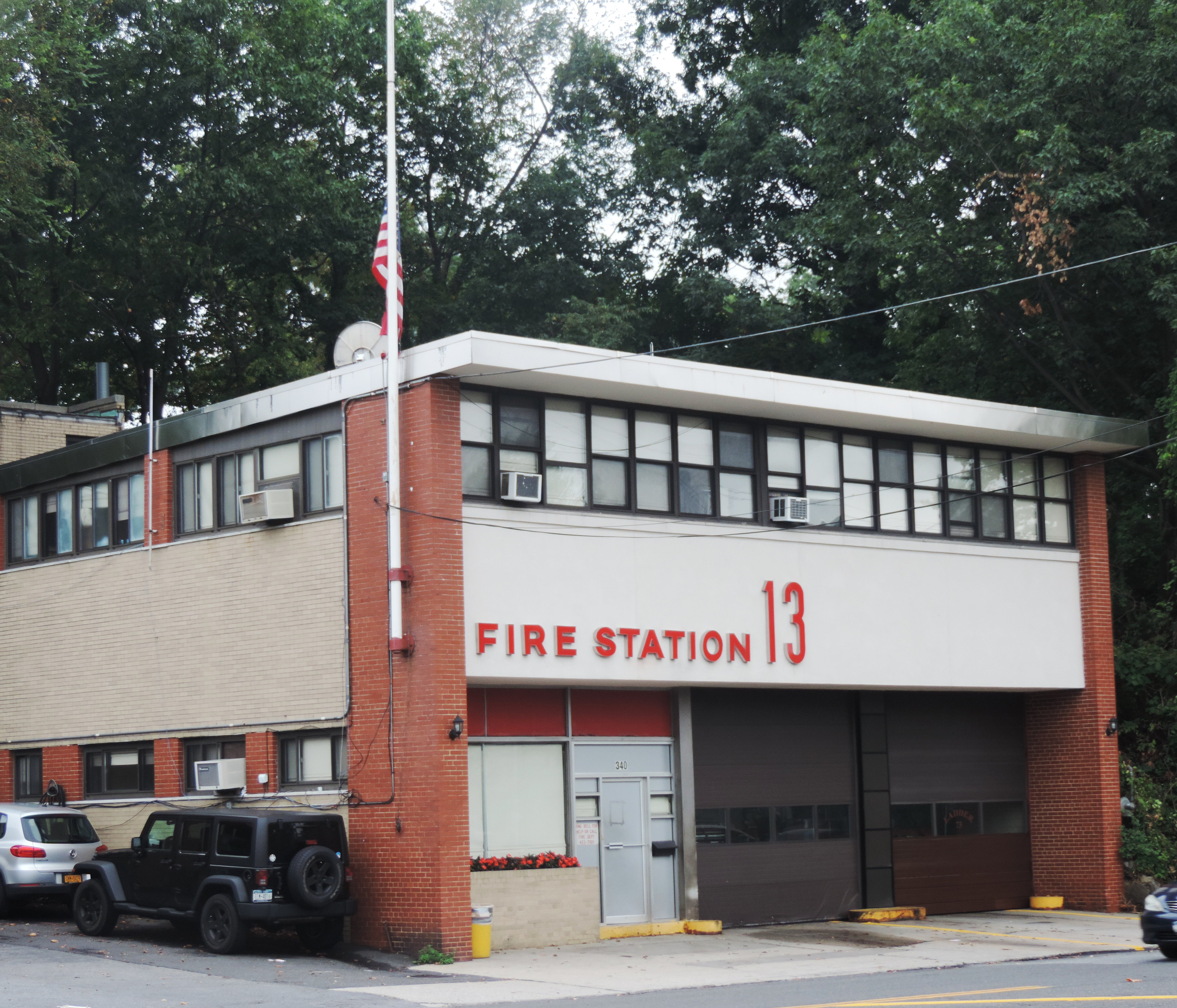
Firehouse

Dunwoodie is a neighborhood in Yonkers, New York, noted for being the home of St. Joseph's Seminary and College on Valentine Hill. Dunwoodie (proper) is located north of the Seminary, while Dunwoodie Heights includes the seminary and what is south of it. Dunwoodie also includes Yonkers' "Little Italy" and a public golf course.

The Yonkers Raceway is close by, located in Wakefield Park, while the Cross County Shopping Mall is also close by, but located in the neighborhood of Kimball. St. Joseph's Seminary is located technically in the neighborhood of Seminary Heights, but it is colloquially known as Dunwoodie.

The Bee-Line Bus System has bus stops near the Cross County Shopping Center and Yonkers Raceway. The neighborhood is also accessible by exit 3 on the I-87 (Major Deegan Expressway). The Bronx River Parkway (to Exit 11W) and Cross County Expressway (exit 4S) are also nearby.

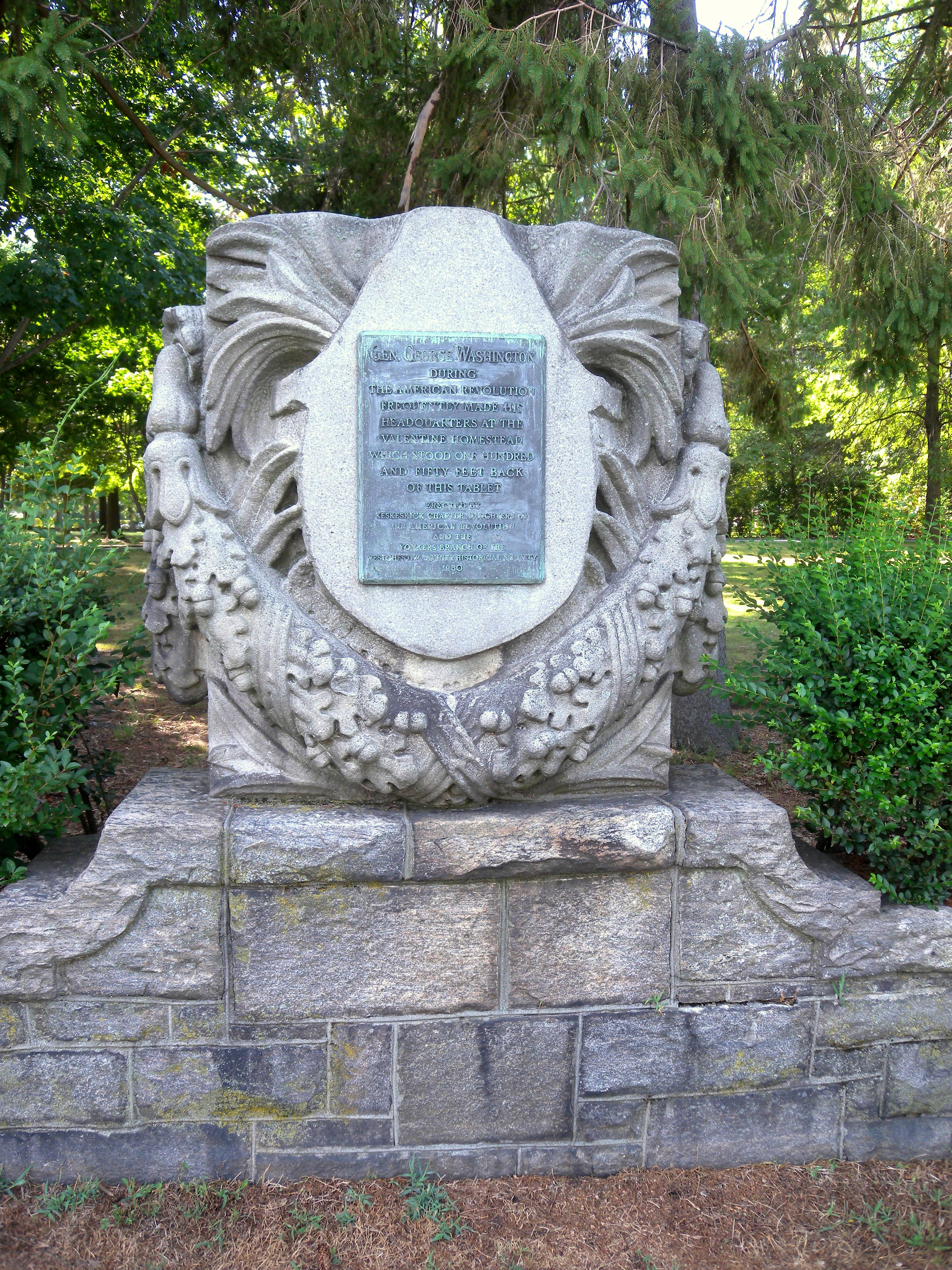
Valentine Hill Monument

The Valentine Hill Monument (near the Seminary) and the Camping Ground Marker (at Seminary Avenue and Mile Square Road) highlight the significance of the location during the American Revolutionary War. The monument commemorates George Washington's headquarters at the site of the former Valentine family homestead, used several times during the war, most notably in October 1776 before the Battle of White Plains and in July 1781 during the Grand Reconnaissance. The Camping Ground Marker notes this area as a camping ground, or staging area, for American and British forces during the war.

== Intellectual life ==
Dunwoodie has given its name to The Dunwoodie Review, a theological journal published at St. Joseph's Seminary. The journal is a successor to the New York Review which was published by the seminary from 1905 to 1908. The Dunwoodie Review was published from 1961 to 1974 and, after a hiatus, annually from 1990 to the present.
