= Austin Bernard Vaughan =

American Catholic bishop

- Auxiliary bishop
- Church: Roman Catholic
- Archdiocese: New York

Orders
- Ordination: December 8, 1951
- Consecration: June 29, 1977

Personal details
- Born: September 27, 1927 New York City
- Died: June 25, 2000 (aged 72)
- Denomination: Christian

Austin Bernard Vaughan (September 27, 1927 – June 25, 2000) was an American prelate of the Catholic Church who served as an auxiliary bishop of the Archdiocese of New York from 1977 to 2000.

== Biography ==
=== Early life ===
Austin Vaughn was born on September 27, 1927, in New York City. Having decided to become a priest, Vaughan entered St. Joseph's Seminary in Yonkers, New York. He then traveled to Rome to reside at the Pontifical North American College while continuing his studies.

=== Priesthood ===
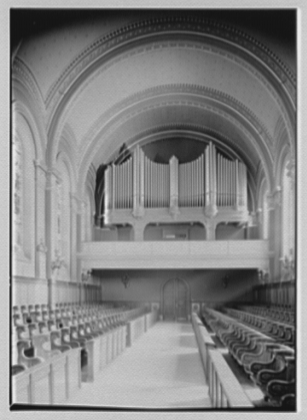
St. Joseph's Seminary, Yonkers, New York (1943)

Vaughan was ordained a priest in Rome in the chapel of the Pontifical North American College on December 8, 1951, for the Archdiocese of New York by Archbishop Martin John O’Connor. He received a Licentiate in Sacred Theology from the college in 1952, then a doctorate from the Pontifical Gregorian University in Rome in 1954.

Returning to New York, Vaughan in 1956 was named to the faculty of St. Joseph's Seminary where he taught theology. He was named rector of St. Joseph's in 1973.

=== Auxiliary Bishop of New York ===
On May 24, 1977, Pope Paul VI named Vaughan as an auxiliary bishop of New York and titular bishop of Cluain Iraird. He was consecrated bishop on June 29, 1977, at St. Patrick's Cathedral in Manhattan by Cardinal Terence Cooke.

In December 1988, Vaughan was convicted of disorderly conduct at a Women's Health Pavilion location in the New York City area during an anti-abortion protest. In 1990, Vaughan was arrested in Albany, New York, for trespassing on the grounds of a women's health clinic that provided abortion services. While serving ten days in jail, he stated that New York Governor Mario Cuomo was in ''serious risk of going to hell'' for his support of women's abortion rights.

In the Catholic New Yorker, January 1987, Vaughan described himself as "one of the most conservative bishops in the Catholic Church, USA. He was entrusted with the translation into English from the Latin of official Vatican documents. But he went on to say in his Catholic New Yorker newspaper article that he was enthralled by his attendance at an Epiphany celebration, January 6, 1987.

=== Death and legacy ===
Vaughan died of a cardiac arrest on June 25, 2000, in Yonkers.

== Notes ==
Catholic Church titles
Preceded by –	Auxiliary Bishop of New York; 1977–2000	Succeeded by –
