= John Maguire (coadjutor archbishop of New York) =

American clergyman

His Excellency, The Most Reverend John Maguire
- Coadjutor Archbishop of New York
- In office: 1965–1980

Orders
- Ordination: December 22, 1928 by Giuseppe Palica
- Consecration: June 29, 1959 by Francis Spellman

Personal details
- Born: December 11, 1904 New York City, US
- Died: July 6, 1989 (aged 84) Manhattan, New York City, US
- Buried: St. Patrick's Cathedral
- Denomination: Roman Catholic
- Education: Regis High School
- Alma mater: Cathedral College
- Motto: Tutam Reclude Semitam (Disclose a way of life free of danger)

John Joseph Maguire (December 11, 1904 – July 6, 1989) was an American prelate of the Roman Catholic Church. He served as an auxiliary bishop (1959 to 1965) and as coadjutor archbishop (1965 to 1980) of the Archdiocese of New York.

== Biography ==
=== Early life and education ===
John Maguire was born on December 11, 1904, in New York City to James and Ellen Marie (née Shea) Maguire. He attended Regis High School in Manhattan and Cathedral College in Queens.

Maguire began his studies for the priesthood at St. Joseph's Seminary in Yonkers, New York. Two years later, Cardinal Patrick Hayes sent Maguire to Rome to continue his studies at the Pontifical North American College.

=== Priesthood ===
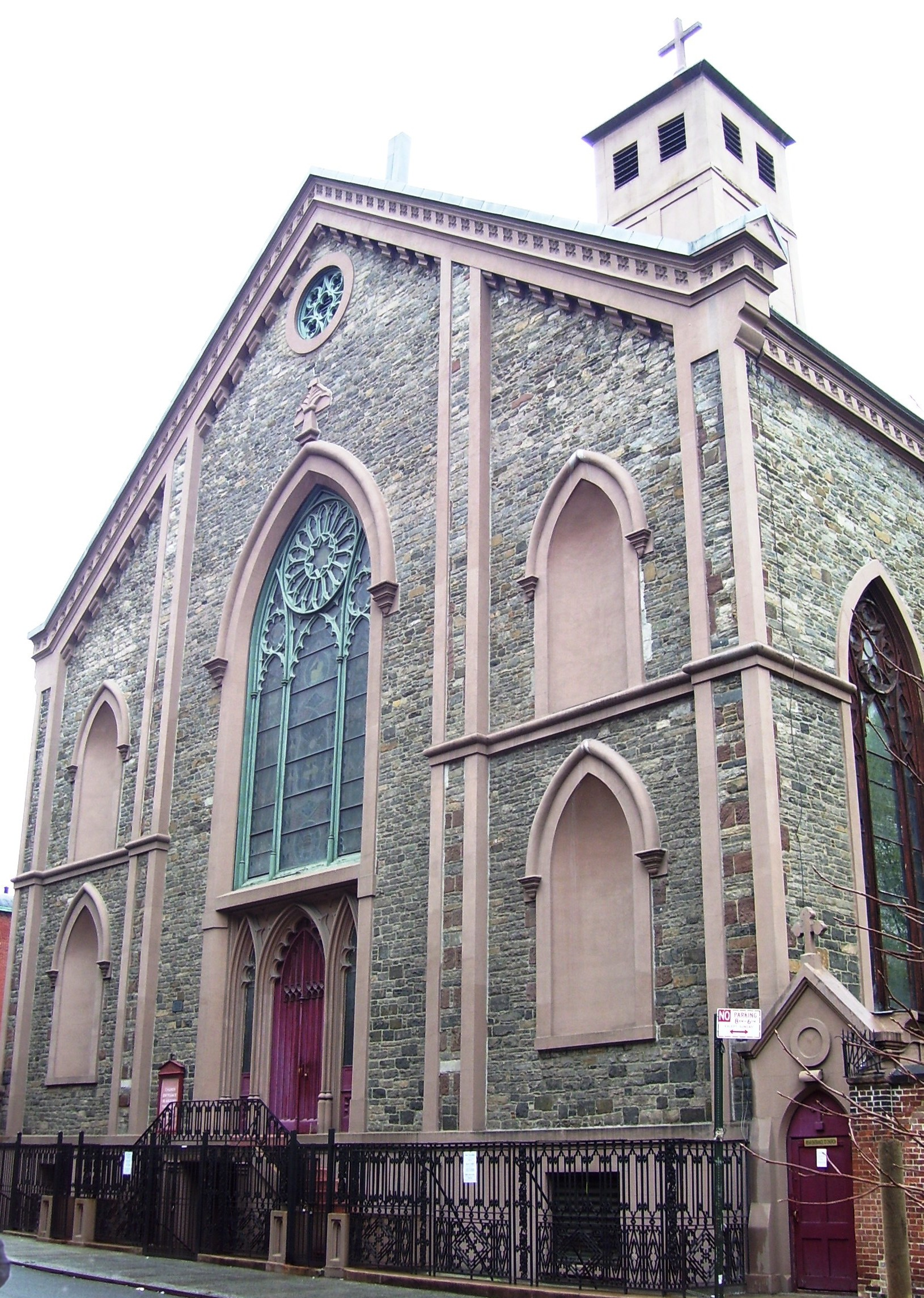
St. Patrick's Old Cathedral, Manhattan, New York (2011)

On December 22, 1928, Maguire was ordained a priest for the Archdiocese of New York by Archbishop Giuseppe Palica in the Basilica of St. John Lateran in Rome. Upon his return to New York, Maguire's knowledge of Italian led to his first assignment as a curate at St. Patrick's Old Cathedral in Manhattan, which had a large Italian-American congregation.

Maguire was appointed assistant chancellor of the archdiocese in 1940, vice-chancellor in 1945 and chancellor in 1947. The Vatican elevated Maguire to the rank of domestic prelate in 1948. In 1953, Archbishop Francis Spellman named Maguire as vicar general of the archdiocese, a post he held until 1980.

=== Auxiliary Bishop of New York ===
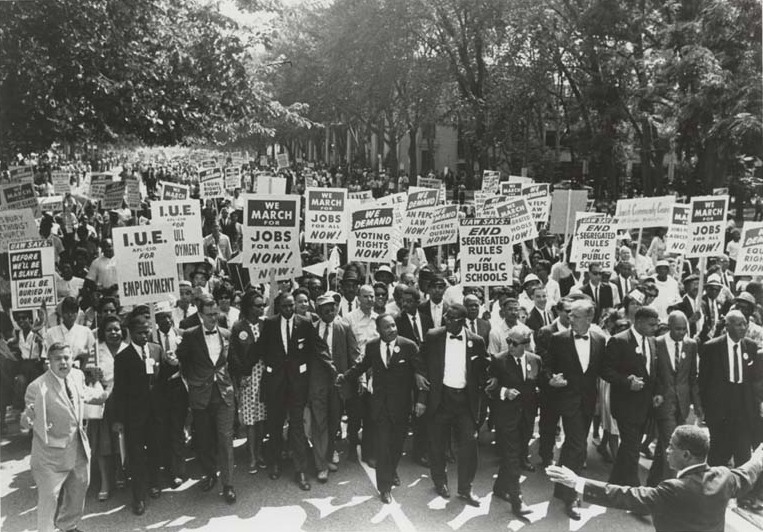
March on Washington for Jobs and Freedom (1963)

On May 16, 1959, Maguire was appointed as an auxiliary bishop of New York and titular bishop of Antiphrae by Pope John XXIII. He received his episcopal consecration on June 29, 1959, from Spellman, with Bishops Joseph Francis Flannelly and James Griffiths serving as co-consecrators, at St. Patrick's Cathedral. Maguire assumed as his episcopal motto: Tutam Reclude Semitam (Latin: "Disclose a way of life free of danger"), taken from the hymn "Praeclara custos virginum" (For the Blessed Virgin Mary).

Known as a champion for racial justice, Maguire encouraged New York Catholics to participate in the 1963 March on Washington for Jobs and Freedom, during which Doctor Martin Luther King Jr. delivered his historic "I Have a Dream" speech. Maguire later joined other religious leaders in an amicus curiae brief asking the U.S. Supreme Court to rule racial discrimination in the sale of housing as unconstitutional.

Maguire was also an outspoken supporter of ecumenism and frequently participated in joint services with clergymen from other faiths. He also took a special interest in the Hispanic Catholic community, learning Spanish and often traveling to Puerto Rico.

=== Coadjutor Archbishop of New York ===
On September 15, 1965, Maguire was named coadjutor archbishop of New York and titular archbishop of Tabalta by Pope Paul VI. His appointment placed New York in the unique situation of having two archbishops at the same time. A coadjutor is usually named when the ordinary of an archdiocese or diocese is ill or close to retirement, or when a diocese is particularly large; the 76-year-old Spellman had recently undergone prostate surgery. However, unlike most coadjutor bishops, Maguire did not possess the automatic right of succession.

Following Spellman's death in December 1967, Maguire was elected by the archdiocesan board of consultors to serve as apostolic administrator of New York until the pope named a new archbishop. In the interim, he was mentioned as a top candidate to fill the vacant post, but Paul VI ultimately appointed Auxiliary Bishop Terence Cooke as archbishop in March 1968.

=== Later life and death ===
After reaching the mandatory retirement age of 75, Maguire resigned as coadjutor archbishop and vicar general on January 8, 1980. During his retirement, Maguire resided at the rectory at St. Patrick's Cathedral.

Maguire died on July 6, 1989, at St. Vincent's Hospital in Manhattan at age 84. Upon his death, Cardinal John O'Connor said, "For myself, Archbishop Maguire was the linchpin which linked the archdiocese of yesterday with the archdiocese of today." Maguire is interred near the deceased archbishops of New York in the crypt beneath the main altar of St. Patrick's Cathedral.

Catholic Church titles
Preceded by –	Coadjutor Archbishop of New York; 1965–1980	Succeeded by –
Preceded by –	Auxiliary Bishop of New York; 1959–1965	Succeeded by –
