= Joseph Maria Pernicone =

Catholic bishop

- Auxiliary Bishop of New York
- In office: 1954-1978

Orders
- Ordination: December 18, 1926
- Consecration: May 5, 1954 by Francis Spellman, Joseph Francis Flannelly and Edward Vincent Dargin

Personal details
- Born: November 4, 1903 Regalbuto, Sicily
- Died: February 11, 1985 (aged 81) Jacobi Hospital in the Bronx
- Denomination: Roman Catholic
- Parents: Salvatore and Petronilla (née Taverna) Pernicone
- Education: Cathedral College
- Alma mater: St. Joseph's Seminary

Joseph Maria Pernicone (November 4, 1903 – February 11, 1985) was an Italian-born cleric of the Roman Catholic Church. He served as an auxiliary bishop of the Archdiocese of New York from 1954 to 1978.

== Biography ==
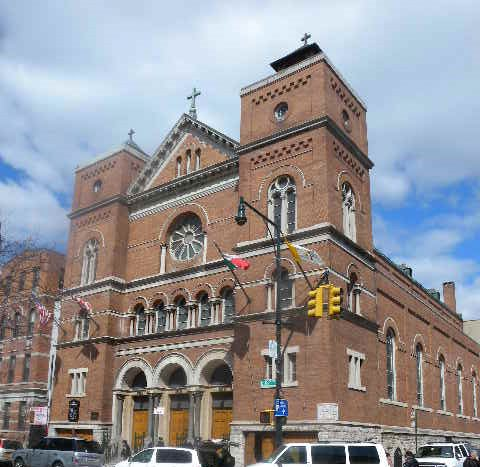
Our Lady of Carmel Church, Bronx, New York (2011)

=== Early life ===
Joseph Pernicone was born on November 4, 1903, in Regalbuto, Sicily, to Salvatore and Petronilla (née Taverna) Pernicone. He received his early preparation for the priesthood at the seminaries in Nicosia and Catania in Italy. Pernicone immigrated to the United States in 1920. He continued his studies at Cathedral College in New York City and St. Joseph's Seminary in Yonkers, New York.

=== Priesthood ===
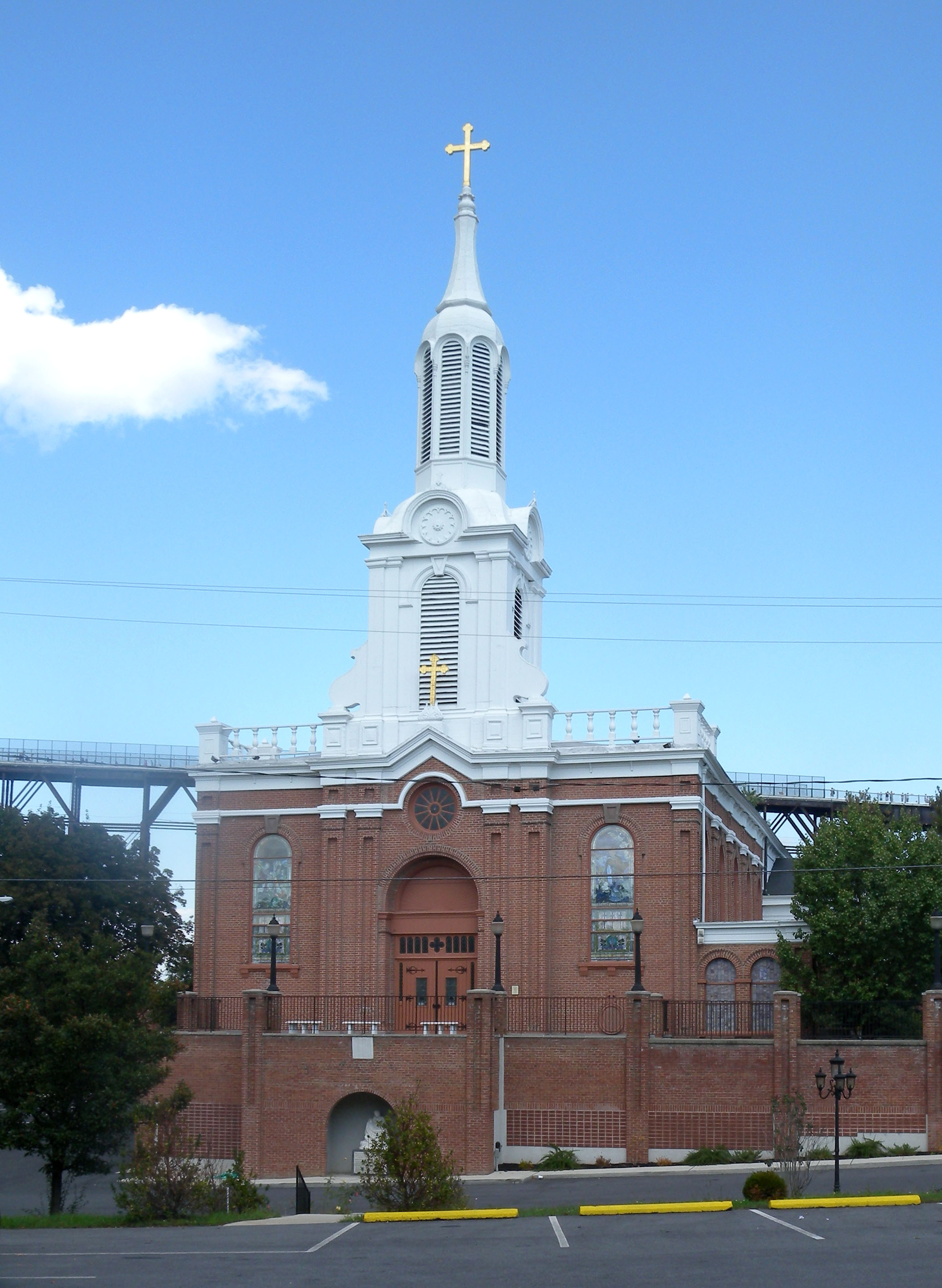
Our Lady of Carmel Church, Poughkeepsie, New York (2009)

Pernicone was ordained to the priesthood in New York City by Auxiliary Bishop John Joseph Dunn for the Archdiocese of New York on December 18, 1926. After his 1926 ordination, the archdiocese assigned Pernicone as curate at Our Lady of Mount Carmel Parish in Yonkers.

Several years later, Pernicone traveled to Washington, D.C. to study canon law as the Catholic University of America (CUA). In 1932, he earned a Doctor of Canon Law degree from the CUA School of Canon Law. After returning to New York in 1932, the archdiocese assigned him as pastor of Our Lady of Mount Carmel Parish in Poughkeepsie, New York. During this period, Pernicone served as master of ceremonies at a 1937 requiem mass for Guglielmo Marconi, the inventor of wireless telegraphy, in 1937.

In 1944, after 12 years at Our Lady in Poughkeepsie, Pernicone was named pastor of Our Lady of Mount Carmel Parish in the Bronx. During his 22 years at Our Lady, he oversaw the construction of a parochial school in 1949. The Vatican elevated Pernicone to the rank of papal chamberlain in 1945 and domestic prelate in 1952.

=== Auxiliary Bishop of New York ===
On April 6, 1954, Pernicone was appointed auxiliary bishop of New York and titular bishop of Hadrianopolis in Honoriade by Pope Pius XII. He received his episcopal consecration on May 5, 1954, from Cardinal Francis Spellman, with Auxiliary Bishops Joseph Francis Flannelly and Edward Vincent Dargin serving as co-consecrators, at St. Patrick's Cathedral in Manhattan.

During his tenure as an auxiliary bishop, Pernicone also served as pastor of Holy Trinity Parish in Poughkeepsie and episcopal vicar of Dutchess and Putnam Counties in New York State.

=== Death and legacy ===
After reaching the mandatory retirement age of 75, Pernicone retired as auxiliary bishop on November 28, 1978.He died from a stroke on February 11, 1985, at Jacobi Hospital in the Bronx at age 81.

Catholic Church titles
Preceded by –	Auxiliary Bishop of New York; 1954–1978	Succeeded by –
