= Our Lady of Mount Carmel Church (Bronx) =

Historic Roman Catholic Church in New York, US

Coordinates: 40°51′18″N 73°53′10.8″W

The Church of Our Lady of Mount Carmel
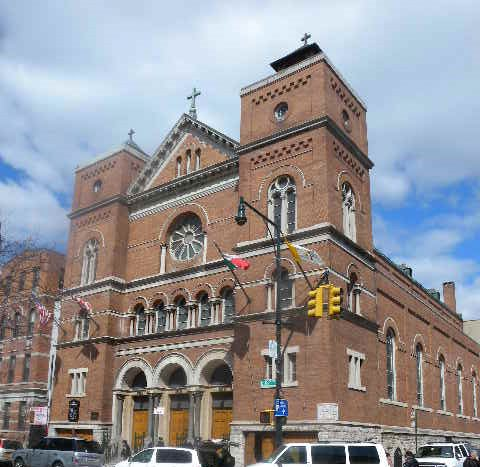

General information
- Architectural style: Romanesque Revival
- Location: Belmont, Bronx, New York City, New York, United States
- Construction started: 1906 (for church)
- Completed: 1907 (for basement church); 1912 (for upper church)
- Cost: $21,000 (for 1906 church property) $12,000 (for 1906-1912 church)
- Client: Roman Catholic Archdiocese of New York

Technical details
- Structural system: Masonry brick

Website
- Our Lady of Mt. Carmel

The Church of Our Lady of Mount Carmel is a Roman Catholic parish church under the authority of the Roman Catholic Archdiocese of New York, located three blocks south of Fordham University at the corner of Belmont Avenue and 627 East 187th Street, Fordham, the Bronx, New York City, New York.

== Parish history ==
Another parish church for Italians existed in 1892, located at 447 E 115th Street, Manhattan. Despite the similar dedication, this has always been a separate parish. "In answer to the petition of the Italians living in the neighborhood of 183rd Street and Pelham Avenue, Rev. Daniel Burke, D.D., of St. Philip's Church, opened a mission for them early in 1906." There were initially only around 150 people attending the mission. The Rev. Francis Magliocco, D.D., was appointed assistant in September, 1909, and Fr. Caffuzzi was reported in 1914 to have resided near the church (and not in a rectory) since January 1907.

The parish was established around June 1906 when a store was remodeled as a chapel, and the Rev. J. Caffuzzi was appointed acting pastor on June 24. The congregation increased rapidly. By the end of 1907, the congregation had swelled from its 150 figure in 1906 to 1,134 adults and 150 children by the end of 1907, and 2,500 adults in 1914. By 1914, the Sunday school had an attendance of 800 children.

== Buildings ==
By "...the end of [1906] Father Burke bought seven lots costing $21,000 at 187th Street and Belmont Avenue, and on June 29, 1907, Archbishop (later Cardinal) Farley laid the cornerstone of the church." The 750-seat basement was opened December 25, 1907; the upper 500-seat upper church was opened December 8, 1912, at a cost of $12,000. The upstairs church was dedicated in 1917. The rectory address is 627 East 187 St., Bronx NY 10458.

== Pastors ==
- Rev. Daniel F.X. Burke, D.D., of St. Philip's Church (1906-1906), attended to mission in early 1906
- Rev. Msgr. Joseph Caffuzzi (1906-9/29/1931) , first pastor, assisted by the Rev. Francis Magliocco, D.D. since 1909
- Rev. Severino Focacci (1931-1944)
- Most Rev. Joseph Maria Pernicone (1944-1966) , became an Auxiliary Bishop of the Archdiocese of New York in 1954 during his pastorate
- Rev. Msgr. Carlo (Charles) Rizzo (1966-1972)
- Rev. Msgr. Louis A. Martorella (1972-1984)
- Rev. Msgr. John A. Ruvo (1984-2008)
- Rev. Eric D. Rapaglia (2008-2014)
- Rev. Salvatore D. Sportino (2014-2015)
- Rev. Jonathan Morris (2015-2019)
- Rev. Jose Felix Ortega de la Fuente (2021–present)

== Our Lady of Mount Carmel School ==
Located at 2465 Bathgate Avenue on the corner of East 189th Street and Bathgate Avenue, it has around 25 to 30 students per grade.
