= Bronx Marian apparitions =

1945 apparition of the Virgin Mary

Coordinates: 40.87661518°N 73.8860454°W

Bronx Marian apparitions Our Lady of the Concourse Our Lady of the Universe
- Location: Grand Concourse, The Bronx, United States
- Date: October 29 to November 14, 1945
- Witness: Joseph Vitolo
- Type: Marian apparition
- Shrine: Queen of the Universe Shrine, Bronx

The Bronx Marian apparitions were a series of 1945 Marian apparitions seen by Joseph Vitolo, a 9-year-old boy, in the Concourse neighborhood of The Bronx. The apparitions took place from October 29 to November 14 of that year. The apparitions drew wide interest at the time, concluding with up to 30,000 people attending the final night's vigil. Interest in the event waned over time, though Vitolo still prayed nightly at a shrine founded on the apparition site. The shrine still exists today. The Catholic Church has never taken a stand on the validity of the events. The apparitions have also been referred to as Our Lady of the Concourse, Our Lady of the Universe, and the Bronx Miracle.

== Background ==
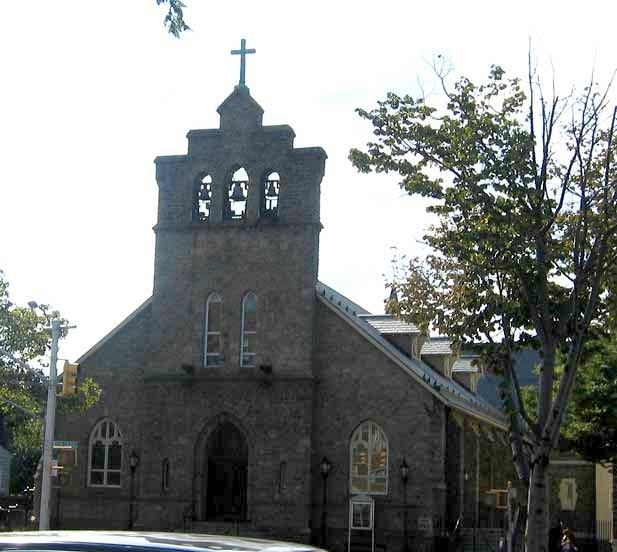
St. Philip Neri Church, the Catholic church near the Vitolo family home, as pictured in 2005

Joseph F. Vitolo, Jr. was born on March 25, 1936. He was nicknamed "Joe" and "Jo Jo", and was the 18th child (11 of whom lived past infancy) of two poor Italians in the Bronx. Their Catholic family lived at 3194 Villa Avenue, and were members of the St. Phillip of Neri parish in the Bronx. Vitolo was considered the baby of the family, and was small for his age. He was described as a "very bright and high-strung boy" by Life magazine in 1945. By his own account, Vitolo was not greatly familiar with religion as a child, attending public school instead of Catholic school. His mother actively attended church, but not his father, who he said was an alcoholic and abusive towards his mother.

== Events ==
The sightings occurred every night for 17 days in 1945, starting on October 29 and ending on November 14.

=== Timeline ===
==== First appearance (October 29) ====
After dinner on October 29, nine-year-old Joseph Vitolo was playing with four other children on a fifteen foot rocky ledge on the west side of the Grand Concourse. A figure appeared to Vitolo, invisible to the other children. This was a lady, dressed in various colors. First in white, then in blue, and then in black. She told him to not be afraid, to pray, and gave him a candle invisible to the other children. As Vitolo trembled, another child, Jeannette Nocerino, told him to "pray like you mean it". Finally, the lady told Joseph to return the same time the next night.

Vitolo told the other children what happened, and then returned to his home to tell his parents. His father did not believe him, but his mother told him to return to the spot the next night.

==== Succeeding appearances (October 30—November 13) ====
Vitolo returned to the site the next day on October 30, and saw the same lady, this time carrying white roses and wearing a crown. Still trembling, Vitolo heard the lady announce that she would return for sixteen nights. Reports emerged that Joseph had predicted the appearance of a spring and the building of a grotto. By November 14, Vitolo denied ever being told of a spring or a well by the lady. A few dozen neighbors watched the sighting, many of whom brought devotional items such as rosary beads and candles. The candles were arranged in the shape of a cross, and several witnesses reported all but the center candle suddenly being extinguishing. From here news of the apparition spread. The Bronx Home News was tipped on the events, and other major media outlets picked up the story. Most spectators on October 29 and 30 were members of the St. Philip of Neri church, whose leaders declined to comment.

On the night of October 31, Vitolo said the lady asked him if he knew of Bernadette of Lourdes, to which he said no. She told him to do what Bernadette did. Many in the crowd were skeptical, but relented after the candles again mysteriously extinguished.

On the night of November 1, three thousand came to the site. Joseph came at 7:00 pm. Rumors spread that he predicted that a church would be built on the site. From this point, many people began to report miracles from the site. Claims ranged from a boy being cured of his deformed hand, to rejuvenating a woman who could not walk.

By November 5, the nightly amount of visitors reached 8,500 people, arriving from as far away as Cleveland, Ohio. During the days during this time, Joseph stopped attending school, spending all day sitting on the ground floor of his family's home attending to the large streams of people (often injured or ailing) who came to ask for his prayers.

Twenty thousand came on November 13, the second to last night, with many devout along with skeptics and hecklers attending. Police blocked off four blocks from traffic, while women who suffered from hysteria where brought to Fordham Hospital.

==== Final appearance (November 14) ====
On the final night, twenty-five to thirty thousand people attended the vigil. The attitude of the day was described as tense, and most of those in attendance believed that Vitolo had predicted the appearance of a well. People from New Jersey and Philadelphia were bused to the Bronx.

Vitolo was brought out at 7:00 pm, and the prayer service continued as it had in previous days. Many in the crowd said the Hail Mary and prayed the rosary. Some clergy and nuns were in attendance, but were hesitant to participate. Vitolo said he saw the lady standing in blue with stars above her head, while he stood at a makeshift shrine covered in statues and other devotional material.

The well many thought was predicted failed to appear, and some could be seen digging for it in the mud. Many disabled hoped to be healed, and one woman said her son's paralyzed finger was healed. Conditions of the day were rainy and many witnesses saw a part of the sky open up during the vigil. One witness reported that they and others saw an angel in the sky, while others reported seeing the Virgin Mary appear to them. The Telegraph-Herald reported that no wider miracle occurred, but several disabled people claimed miraculous healings. The Calgary Herald stated that the crowds failed to see a miracle, while the Toronto Daily Star reported that many left the vigil "convinced they had witnessed a miracle".

At the end of the vigil, Vitolo's family refused to allow him to speak with the press, and his sister Theresa said to journalists that the Virgin Mary had told Vitolo that "I'm not coming any more. I did my work and I do not want you to answer any more questions". Vitolo was reported as being emotional, and shouted at the press to leave and to stop taking pictures.

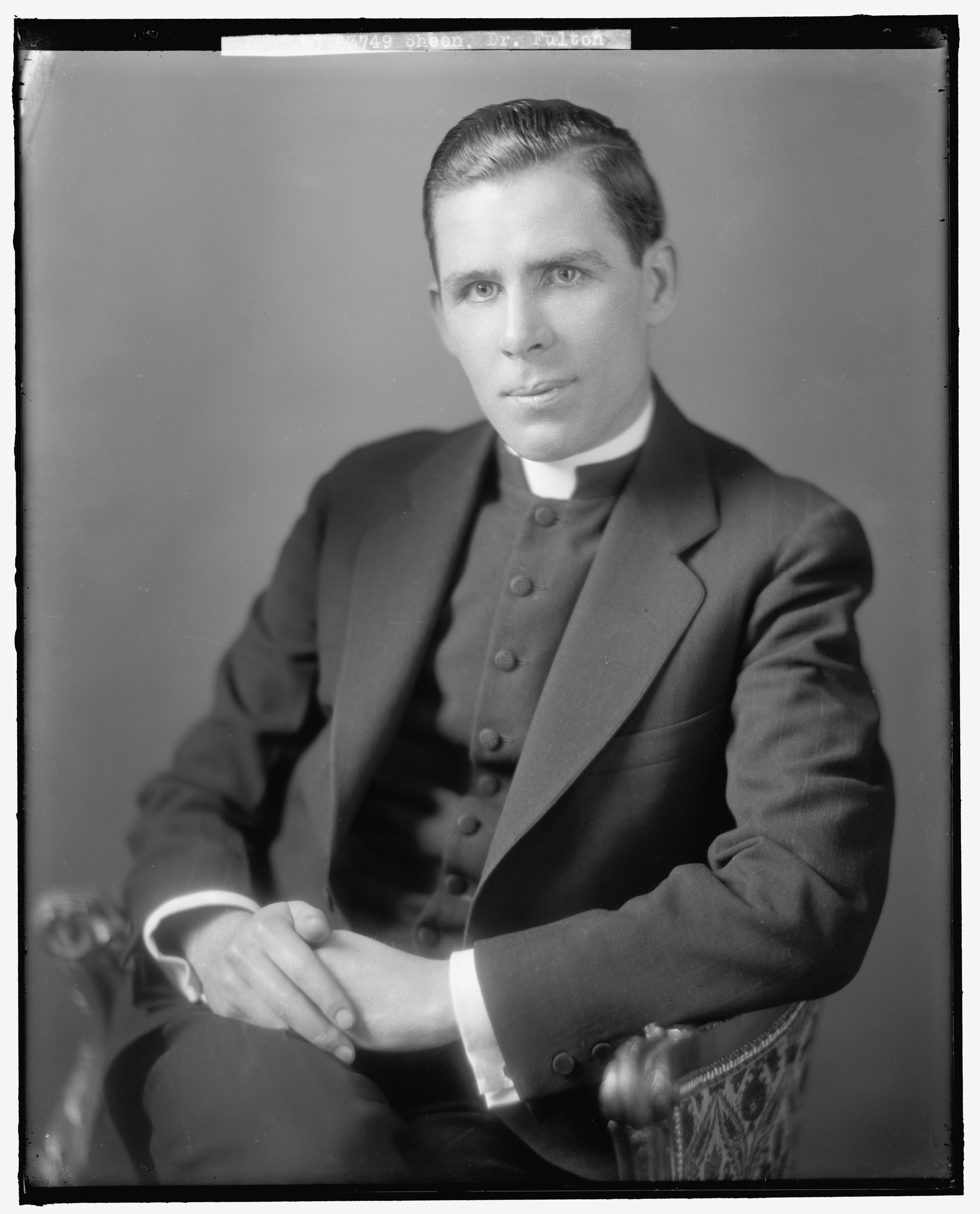
Fulton Sheen, host of the radio show The Catholic Hour, met with Joseph Vitolo in 1945 at the height of public interest in the apparitions

=== Involvement of high-profile Catholics ===
Numerous high profile Catholics were involved, or rumored to be involved in the events. Monsignor Fulton Sheen met with Vitolo during the apparitions. Vitolo was brought to the radio station in Times Square where Sheen hosted his show, The Catholic Hour. After listening to Vitolo's account of the visions, Sheen gave him a dollar to buy lunch at the automat. Francis Spellman, Archbishop of New York, met with Vitolo as well. He arrived late one night in a limousine, and spoke privately with Vitolo.

It was rumored that Frank Sinatra had visited the shrine and left a statue, while others spoke of Lou Costello doing the same thing. As of 2002, Vitolo was in possession of the statues thought to be given by these men.

=== Message of the apparitions ===
Vitolo maintained that the primary message the Virgin Mary brought to him was to "pray for peace". Many in the crowd did not seem to receive this message, and were more concerned with healing their physical wounds or having problems in their lives be ameliorated. Others connected the Bronx apparitions to those at Lourdes, seeing parallels between the situations and the seers.

== Aftermath and later life of Vitolo ==
=== Aftermath ===
Immediately after the conclusion of the events, Vitolo was brought by his family to Indiana for some time in order to evade the press.

Interest waned in the events as time went on, and by the early 21st century, the apparitions were described as largely forgotten, even by local Catholics. Despite the fade of the event in public memory, in 2012, actress and filmmaker Penny Marshall remembered the shrine of the apparitions, saying that "One day Crazy Joseph from Villa Avenue saw the Virgin Mary while we were all playing. Jo-Jo suddenly dropped to his knees and started praying. We didn’t know from the Virgin Mary, but we believed, because they built a shrine".

=== Vitolo's later life ===
Once Vitolo returned to normal life, he began to attend the parish school at Saint Philip Neri, rather than go to public school. Students at the school sometimes mocked him as "Saint Joseph". He, along with members of his family, began to pray at the apparition site nightly at 7:00 pm. Vitolo considered the events the end of his childhood. His new lifestyle caused him to lose friends, and he grew to be a lonely and sad child. In 1950, he was convinced to by visiting Benedictine priests to enter study at a high school seminary in Lisle, Illinois, which he left due to what he saw as unspoken expectations that he would continue to have religious experiences. Vitolo went to two other seminaries, one in Ohio and another in Staten Island, before dropping out of high school altogether. After this, Vitolo worked a variety of odd jobs, while particularly after the deaths of his parents in the 1950s, he became somewhat disillusioned with the shrine, feeling that for all the requests others asked him to give to Mary, his own life had not been aided by the visions.

Vitolo married a woman named Grace in 1963. The couple had two children. Before the marriage, Grace was a Catholic woman very interested in mysticism. She had visited Padre Pio, who predicted that her future husband's name would begin with the letter "J". From around this point Vitolo had a "rejuvenation" in interest in the shrine, particularly after one of Grace's companions, Catherine Passananti, approached him about the shrine.

The shrine never accepted donations, and Vitolo continued to live in poverty for the rest of his life. From 1985, he worked at Jacobi Medical Center, and continued to pray daily at the shrine as his health allowed. By 2002, the shrine had about 70 devotees, from various states in the US.

By the end of his life, Vitolo had poor health. He underwent heart surgery and contracted cancer. Vitolo died on December 17, 2014 at 78 years old.

== Legacy ==
=== Ecclesiastical status of the apparition ===
The Catholic Church has never made an official statement on the apparitions, nor has it ever investigated the events.

=== Analysis of the events ===
Connections with the Bronx visions and the Lourdes apparitions have been discussed. Contemporary media reported that the then popular The Song of Bernadette had been playing in the local theater, or even that Vitolo had seen the film, and recorded that skeptics believed that this had inspired the apparitions. No substantiation ever came that the film had caused Vitolo to concoct the visions, and in his adult life Vitolo resented this speculation. Even so, scholar John T. McGreevy opines that the Lourdes story, particularly in its retellings in The Song of Bernadette (both the novel and the film), had a strong impact on the contemporary reaction to the apparitions. He notes that the widespread rumor of a well appearing bears great similarity to the events of Lourdes, and sees another similarity in the fact that many of Vitolo's visitors came for healing, a large aspect of the Lourdes visions.

McGreevy believes that the reason why priests of the local St. Philip of Neri church hesitated to interact with the events and shrine was a general skepticism towards the credibility of the apparitions. McGreevy also hypothesizes that these suspicions could have been "accentuated by a more general tension between Irish-American clerics and a significant Italian parish population".

=== Queen of the Universe Shrine ===
The shrine made in 1945 still exists at the apparition site, under the title of the "Queen of the Universe Shrine". Once in an empty lot, the site is now in the middle of dense urban architecture and is surrounded by apartments and stores. The shrine contains a statue of Mary on the exact site of the apparition, along with other statues and a rendering of the Ten Commandments.

== See also ==
- List of Marian apparitions
