= Edward Vincent Dargin =

American clergyman

His Excellency, The Most Reverend Edward Vincent Dargin
- Auxiliary Bishop of New York
- In office: 1953-1973

Orders
- Ordination: September 23, 1922 by Cardinal Patrick Joseph Hayes
- Consecration: October 5, 1954 by Cardinal James Francis McIntyre

Personal details
- Born: April 25, 1898 New York City, US
- Died: April 20, 1981 (aged 82) New York City
- Buried: Our Lady of Mercy Cemetery
- Denomination: Roman Catholic
- Education: Fordham University
- Alma mater: St. Joseph's Seminary
- Motto: Totum trahere in cor tuum (Draw it all into your heart)

Edward Vincent Dargin (April 25, 1898 – April 20, 1981) was an American prelate of the Roman Catholic Church. He served as an auxiliary bishop of the Archdiocese of New York from 1953 to 1973.

== Biography ==
=== Early life ===
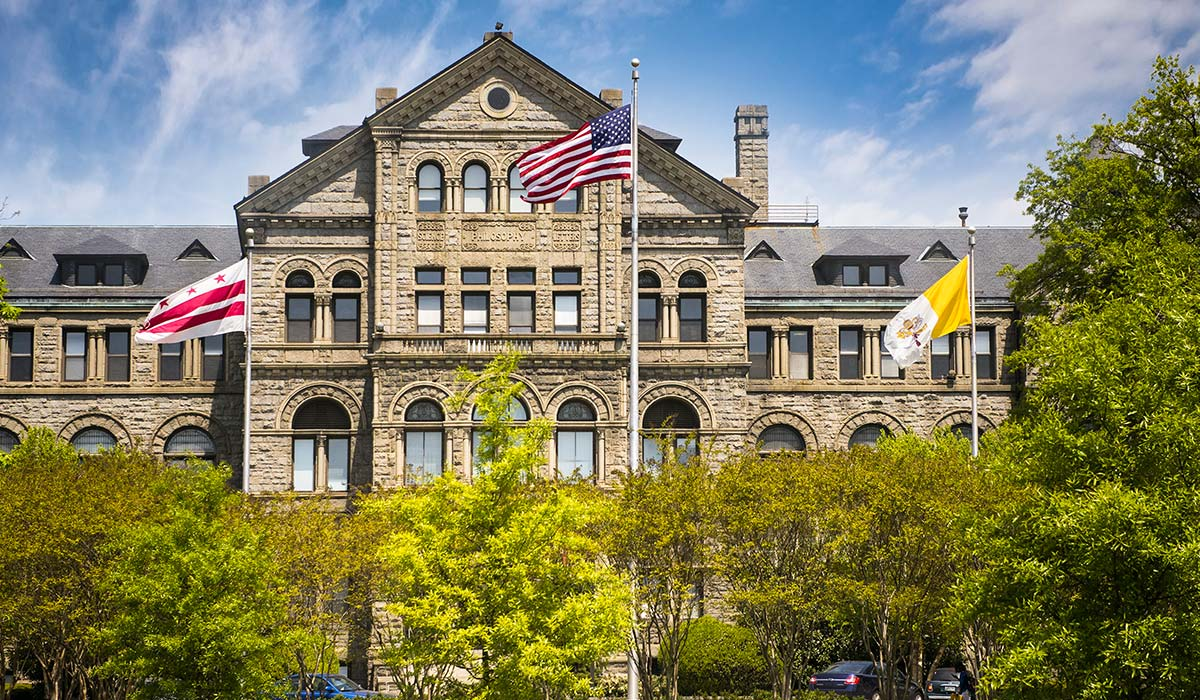
Catholic University of America, Washington, D.C. (2019)

Edward Dargin was born on April 25, 1898, in New York City, one of four children. He graduated from Fordham University in the Bronx in 1919, and completed his theological studies at St. Joseph's Seminary in Yonkers, New York. He earned a Doctor of Canon Law degree from the Catholic University of America in Washington, D.C.

=== Priesthood ===
Dargin was ordained to the priesthood for the Archdiocese of New York by Cardinal Patrick Hayes in New York City on September 23, 1922.

He served for some time as assistant chancellor of the Archdiocese of New York, and was assigned as a curate at a parish in Cold Spring, New York, in 1929. He was pastor of St. Joseph's Parish in Croton Falls, New York, from 1934 to 1940. At that time, he was the youngest pastor in the archdiocese.

The Vatican elevated Dargin to the rank of papal chamberlain in 1941 and domestic prelate in 1943. From 1941 to 1943, Dargin served as officialis of the archdiocesan court, the third-highest position in the Archdiocese. At the end of his tenure as officialis, he was reassigned as pastor of St. Joseph's. He also served as pastor of St. Gregory the Great Church in Harrison, New York, and as vicar general of the archdiocese.

=== Auxiliary Bishop of New York ===
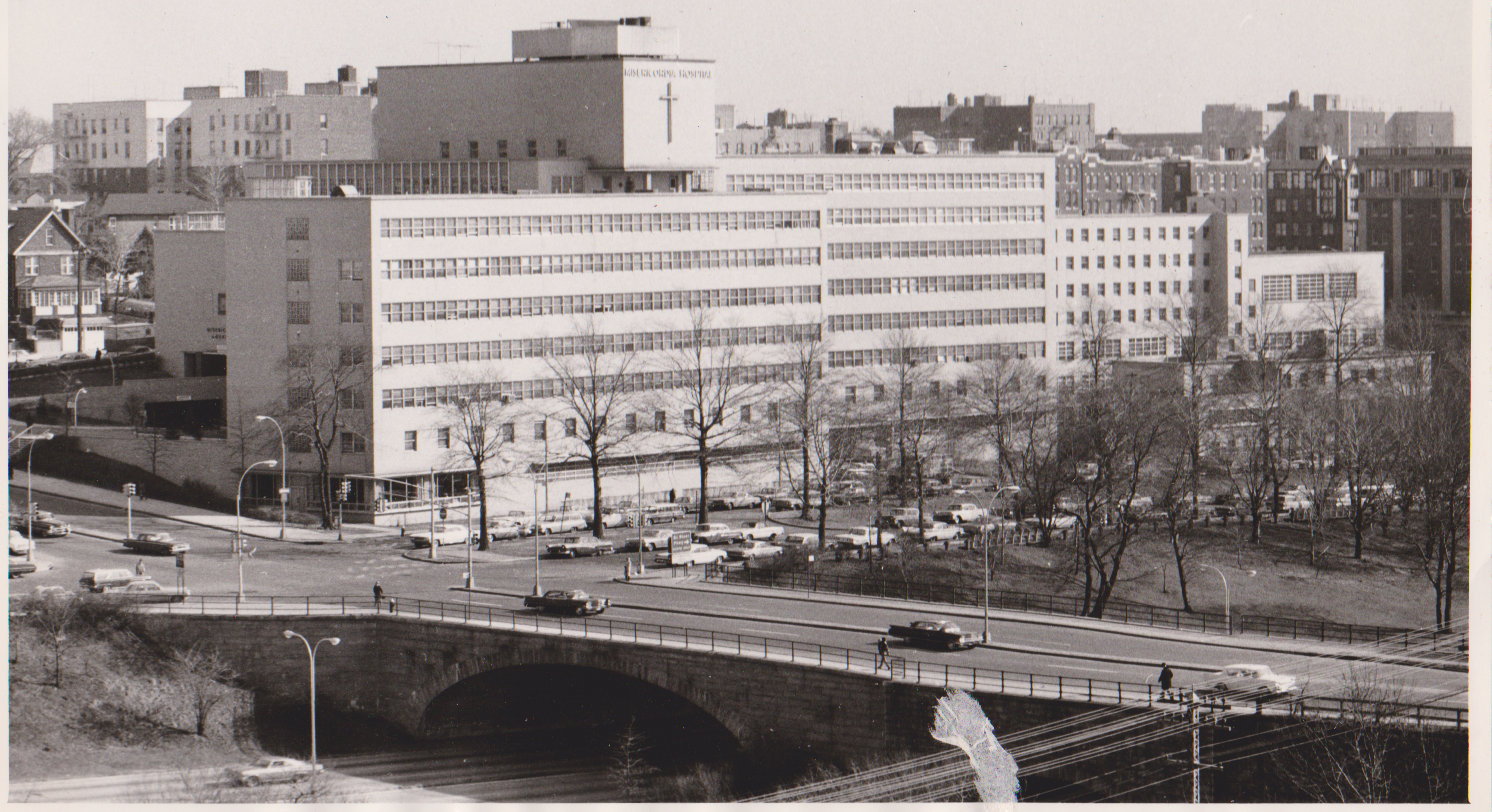
Misericordia Hospital, Bronx, New York (2015)

On August 25, 1953, Dargin was appointed auxiliary bishop of New York and titular bishop of Amphipolis by Pope Pius XII. He received his episcopal consecration on October 5, 1953, from Cardinal James McIntyre, with Bishop William Scully and Auxiliary Bishop Joseph Flannelly serving as co-consecrators, in St. Patrick's Cathedral in Manhattan.

Dargin coordinated the 1957 fundraising campaign relocating Misericordia Hospital from Manhattan to the Bronx, raising over $2.6 million. In 1966, he was named episcopal vicar for Westchester County.

=== Death and legacy ===
After reaching the mandatory retirement age of 75, Dargin resigned as auxiliary bishop of New York on August 11, 1973. He died on April 20, 1981, at the Mary Manning Walsh Home in Manhattan at age 82. He is buried at Our Lady of Mercy Cemetery in Port Chester, New York.

Catholic Church titles
Preceded by –	Auxiliary Bishop of New York; 1953–1973	Succeeded by –
