= John Altieri =

American singer and actor

John F. Altieri (October 16, 1969 – May 4, 2008) was an American singer and stage actor.

Altieri was born in Brockton, Massachusetts. He graduated from Cardinal Spellman High School in 1987, where he became involved in school plays and acting. Altieri went on to receive his bachelor's degree in dramatic literature from Duke University., serving as president of Hoof 'n' Horn, its student-run theater company. In 1991, Altieri moved west to Los Angeles, California, where he earned a master's degree in fine arts from University of California, Los Angeles (UCLA).

Much of Altieri's career centered on a series of successful stints in regional California theaters. His stage credits included The Two Gentlemen of Verona, which was performed in San Jose, California; The Threepenny Opera, performed in Long Beach, California and Romance by David Mamet, which ran in San Diego. In addition to his acting career, worked at the Idyllwild Arts Academy in California, a summer camp for children focusing on acting, for fifteen years. He also volunteered as a coach and director at The Arc of San Francisco, a nonprofit organization serving those with developmental handicaps in San Francisco. Most recently Altieri was on tour with the first national tour of the musical, Jersey Boys, where he was performing the role of Bob Crewe.

John Altieri died of pneumonia in Las Vegas, Nevada, on May 4, 2008, at the age of 38. He had been in the city for a performance of Jersey Boys, where he had joined the theater company for an extended period of time. His funeral was held at Our Lady of Lourdes Roman Catholic Church in Brockton, Massachusetts. He was survived by his parents, Charles and Eileen Altieri, his sister, Mary Nardone and brother, Charles.
