= Francis Spellman =

American Catholic prelate (1889–1967)

His Eminence Francis Spellman
- Archbishop of New York
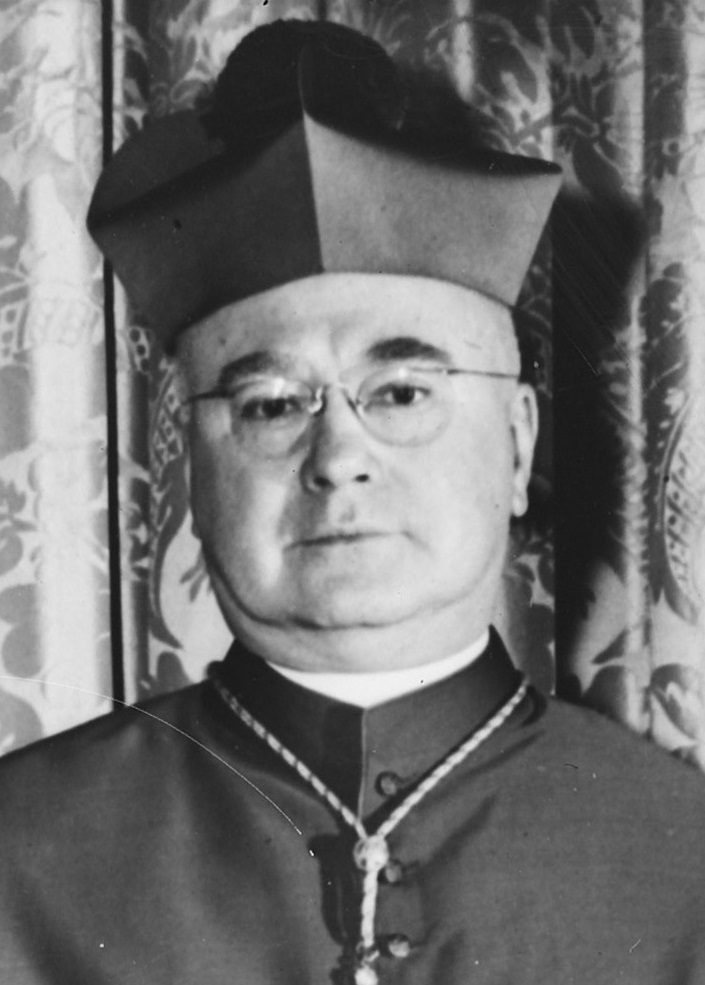
- Cardinal Spellman in 1946
- Church: Catholic Church; Latin Church
- Archdiocese: New York
- Appointed: April 15, 1939
- Installed: May 23, 1939
- Term ended: December 2, 1967
- Predecessor: Patrick Joseph Hayes
- Successor: Terence Cooke
- Other posts: Cardinal-Priest of Ss. Giovanni e Paolo (1946‍–‍1967); Ordinary/Apostolic Vicar for the United States Armed Forces (1939‍–‍1967)
- Previous post: Auxiliary Bishop of Boston (1932‍–‍1939)

Orders
- Ordination: May 14, 1916 by Giuseppe Ceppetelli
- Consecration: September 8, 1932 by Eugenio Pacelli
- Created cardinal: February 18, 1946 by Pius XII
- Rank: Cardinal Priest

Personal details
- Born: Francis Joseph Spellman; May 4, 1889 Whitman, Massachusetts, U.S.
- Died: December 2, 1967 (aged 78) Manhattan, New York City, U.S.
- Buried: St. Patrick's Cathedral, New York
- Education: Fordham University; Pontifical North American College
- Motto: Sequere Deum (Latin for 'Follow God')

Ordination history of Francis Spellman
History
Episcopal consecration
- Consecrated by: Eugenio Pacelli
- Date: September 8, 1932
Episcopal succession
Bishops consecrated by Francis Spellman as principal consecrator
- John Francis O'Hara, C.S.C.: January 15, 1940
- James Francis McIntyre: January 8, 1941
- William Tibertus McCarty, C.Ss.R.: January 25, 1943
- Joseph Patrick Donahue: March 19, 1945
- William Richard Arnold: October 11, 1945
- Thomas John McDonnell: September 15, 1947
- Patrick O'Boyle: January 14, 1948
- Joseph Francis Flannelly: December 16, 1948
- James Henry Ambrose Griffiths: January 18, 1950
- Christopher Joseph Weldon: March 24, 1950
- David Frederick Cunningham: June 8, 1950
- Joseph Oliver Bowers, S.V.D.: January 8, 1953
- Lawrence B. Casey: May 5, 1953
- Joseph Maria Pernicone: May 5, 1954
- Philip Joseph Furlong: January 25, 1956
- Charles Arthur Brown, M.M.: February 27, 1957
- Vincent Ignatius Kennally, S.J.: March 25, 1957
- John Michael Fearns: December 10, 1957
- John William Comber, M.M.: April 9, 1959
- John Joseph Maguire: June 29, 1959
- Tomás Roberto Manning, O.F.M.: July 14, 1959
- Luis Aponte Martínez: October 12, 1960
- Alfredo Méndez-Gonzalez, C.S.C.: October 28, 1960
- Francis Frederick Reh: June 29, 1962
- Thomas Andrew Donnellan: April 9, 1964
- George Theodore Boileau, S.J.: July 31, 1964
- George Henry Guilfoyle: November 30, 1964
- Juan Fremiot Torres Oliver: December 21, 1964
- Terence Cooke: December 13, 1965
- William Joseph Moran: December 13, 1965
- John Joseph Thomas Ryan: March 25, 1966
- Edwin Broderick: March 8, 1967

Francis Joseph Spellman (May 4, 1889 – December 2, 1967) was an American Catholic prelate who served as Archbishop of New York from 1939 until his death in 1967. From 1932 to 1939, Spellman served as an auxiliary bishop of the Archdiocese of Boston. He was created a cardinal by Pope Pius XII in 1946.

== Early life and education ==
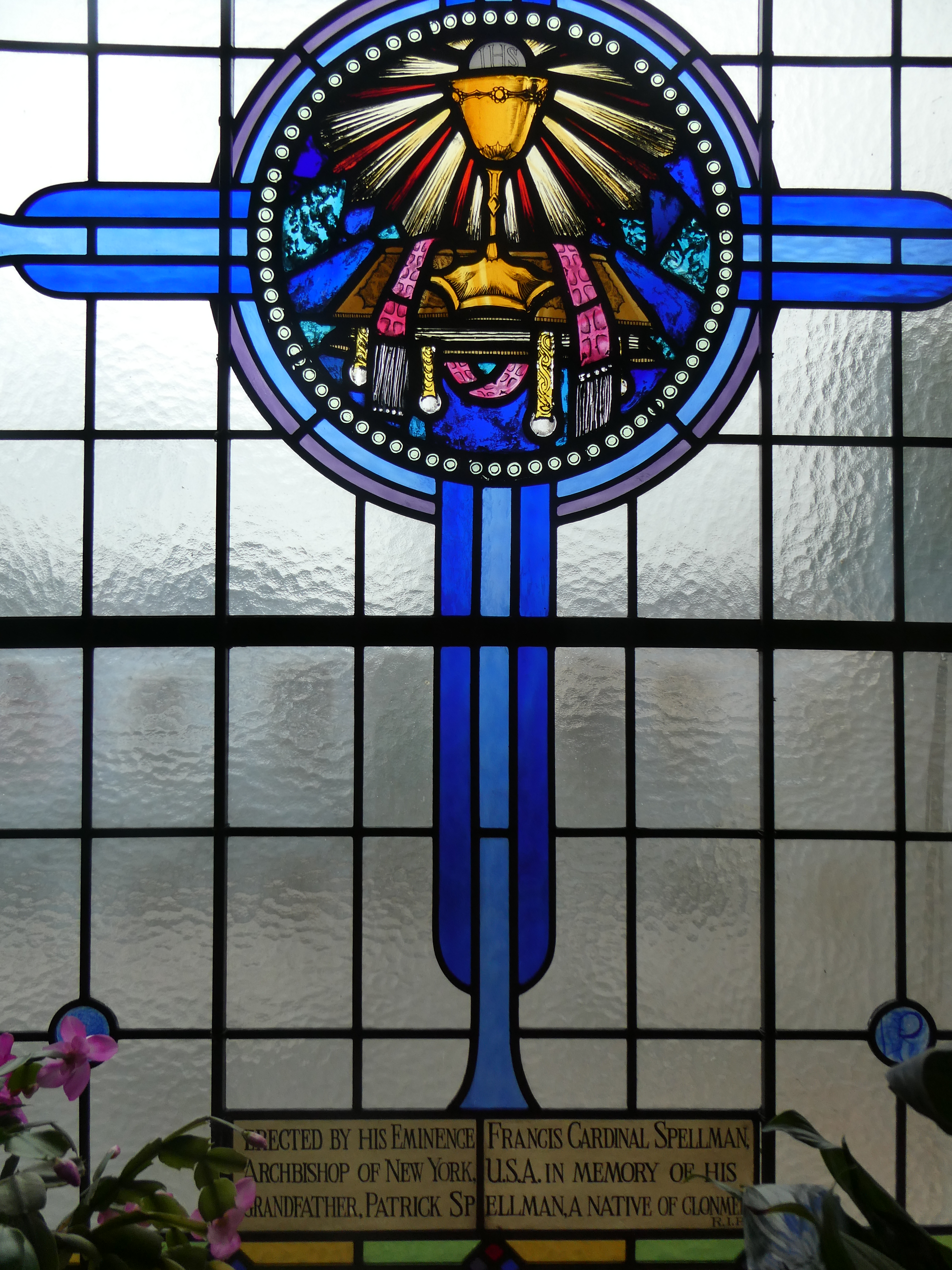
Stained glass window donated to St. Mary's Church, Clonmel, by Spellman in memory of his grandfather Patrick Spellman

Spellman was born on May 4, 1889, in Whitman, Massachusetts, to William Spellman and Ellen (née Conway) Spellman. William Spellman was a grocer whose own parents had immigrated to the United States from Clonmel and Leighlinbridge, Ireland. Spellman had two younger brothers, Martin and John, and two younger sisters, Marian and Helene.

After graduating from Whitman High School, Spellman entered Fordham University in New York City in 1907 and graduated in 1911. Archbishop William O'Connell sent Spellman to study at the Pontifical North American College in Rome. During his years in Rome, Spellman befriended future cardinals Gaetano Bisleti, Francesco Borgongini Duca, and Domenico Tardini.

== Priesthood ==
Spellman was ordained a priest at the Sant'Apollinare Basilica in Rome by Patriarch Giuseppe Ceppetelli on May 14, 1916. Upon his return to the United States, the archdiocese assigned Spellman to pastoral positions at its parishes. O'Connell, who had earlier sent Spellman to Rome, described him as a "little popinjay". He later said, "Francis epitomizes what happens to a bookkeeper when you teach him how to read." Spellman served a series of relatively insignificant assignments.

O'Connell eventually assigned Spellman to promote subscriptions for the archdiocesan newspaper, The Pilot. The archbishop named him as assistant chancellor in 1918 and archivist of the archdiocese in 1924.

After Spellman translated two books by Cardinal Duca into English, the Vatican appointed Spellman as the first American attaché of the Vatican Secretariat of State in Rome in 1925. While serving in the Secretariat, he also worked with the Knights of Columbus in running children's playgrounds in Rome. Pope Pius XI raised Spellman to the rank of privy chamberlain on October 4, 1926.

During a trip to Germany in 1927, Spellman established a lifelong friendship with Archbishop Eugenio Pacelli, who was serving there as apostolic nuncio. Spellman translated Pius XI's first broadcast over Vatican Radio into English in 1931.

Later in 1931, with the fascist government of Benito Mussolini in power in Italy, Spellman secretly transported a papal encyclical, Non abbiamo bisogno, that condemned fascism, out of Rome to Paris for publication. He also served as secretary to Cardinal Lorenzo Lauri at the 1932 International Eucharistic Congress in Dublin, and helped reform the Vatican's press office, introducing mimeograph machines and issuing press releases.

== Episcopal career ==
=== Auxiliary Bishop of Boston ===
On July 30, 1932, Spellman was appointed an auxiliary bishop of Boston and titular bishop of Sila by Pope Pius XI. The pope had originally considered appointing Spellman as bishop of the Dioceses of Portland in Maine or Manchester in New Hampshire. Spellman received his consecration on September 8, 1932, from Cardinal Pacelli at St. Peter's Basilica in Rome. Archbishops Giuseppe Pizzardo and Francesco Borgongini Duca acted as co-consecrators.

Spellman was the first American to be consecrated a bishop at St. Peter's. Borgongini-Duca designed a coat of arms for Spellman that incorporated Christopher Columbus's ship the Santa Maria. Pius XI gave him the motto Sequere Deum ("Follow God").

After his return to the United States, Spellman took up residence at St. John's Seminary in Boston. The archdiocese later assigned him as pastor of Sacred Heart Parish in Newton Centre; while there, he erased the church's $43,000 debt through fundraising. When Spellman's mother died in 1935, Massachusetts Governor James Curley, Lieutenant Governor Joseph Hurley, and many members of the clergy, with the exception of O'Connell, attended the funeral.

In the autumn of 1936, Pacelli came to the United States, ostensibly to visit several cities and be the guest of philanthropist Genevieve Brady. The real reason for the trip was to meet with President Roosevelt to discuss American diplomatic recognition of Vatican City. Spellman arranged and attended the meeting with Pacelli and Roosevelt at Springwood, the Roosevelt estate in Hyde Park, New York.

Spellman became an early friend of Joseph Kennedy Sr, the US ambassador to the United Kingdom and the head of a rich Catholic family. Over the years, Spellman witnessed the marriages of several Kennedy children, including future Senator Robert F. Kennedy, Jean Kennedy, Eunice Kennedy, and future Senator Edward Kennedy.

On Pacelli's trip to the United States, he, Kennedy, and Spellman attempted to stop the vitriolic radio broadcasts of Charles Coughlin. The Vatican and the apostolic legation in Washington wanted his broadcasts to end, but Coughlin's superior, Bishop Michael Gallagher of Detroit, refused to curb him. In 1939, Coughlin was forced off the air by the National Association of Broadcasters.

=== Archbishop of New York ===
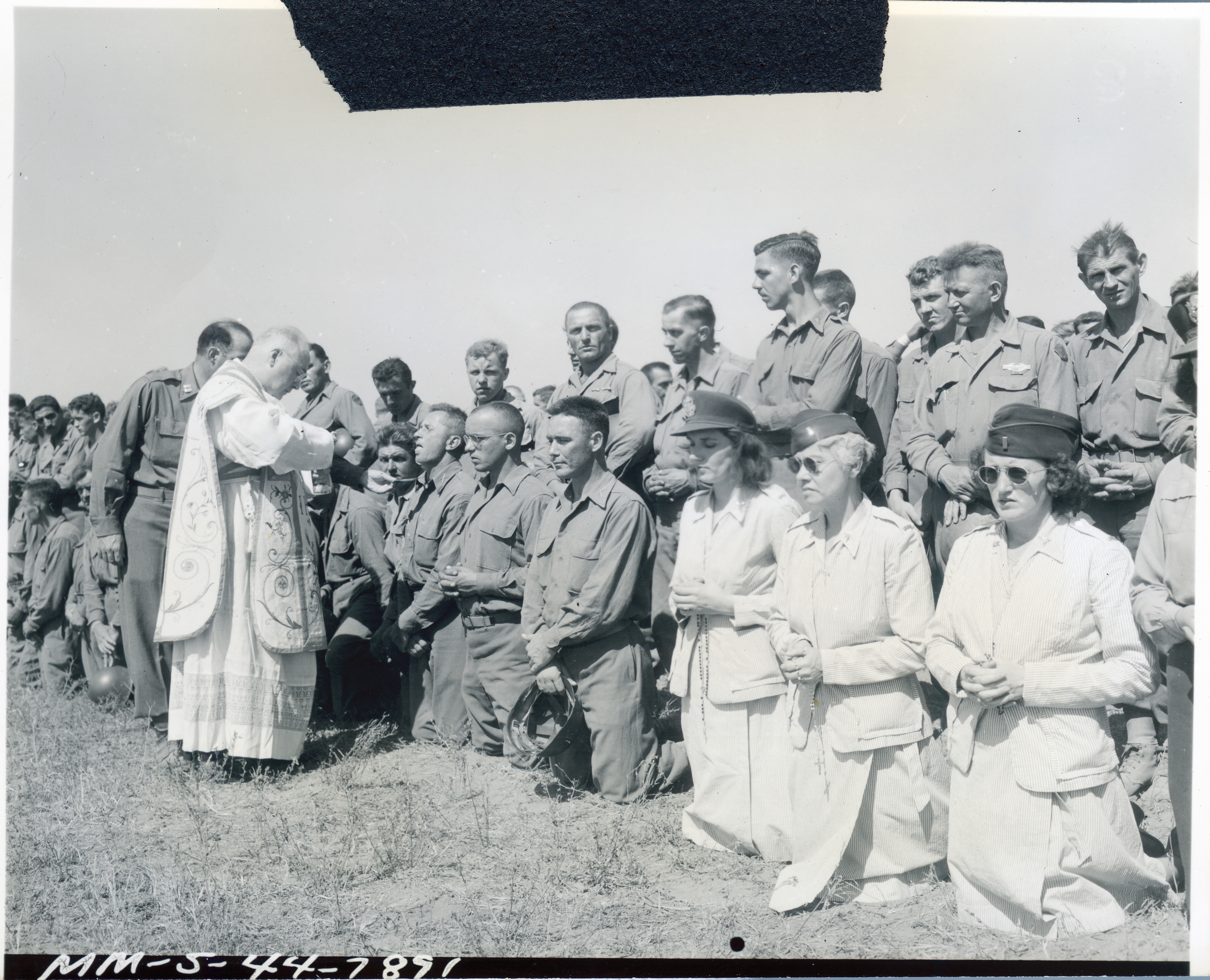
Archbishop Spellman distributing holy communion at mass during a visit to the US Fifth Army in Italy 1944 during World War II.

After Pius XI's death, Pacelli was elected as Pope Pius XII. One of his first acts was to appoint Spellman as the sixth archbishop of New York on April 15, 1939. He was installed as archbishop on May 23, 1939. He was painted twice in 1940 and again in 1941 by the artist Adolfo Müller-Ury. Spellman inaugurated the first regularly scheduled Spanish-language Masses in the archdiocese at St. Cecilia's Parish in East Harlem.

In addition to his duties as diocesan bishop, Pius XII named Spellman as apostolic vicar for the U.S. Armed Forces on December 11, 1939. Over the years, Spellman celebrated many Christmases with American troops stationed in Japan, South Korea, and Europe.

During his tenure in New York, Spellman's considerable national influence in religious and political matters earned his residence the nickname "the Powerhouse". He hosted many prominent clergy, entertainers, and politicians, including the statesman Bernard Baruch, U.S. Senator David I. Walsh, and U.S. House of Representatives Majority Leader John William McCormack. In 1945, Spellman instituted the Al Smith Dinner in Manhattan, an annual white tie fundraiser for Catholic Charities that is attended by prominent national figures.

After his appointment as archbishop, Spellman also became a close confidant of President Roosevelt. During World War II, Roosevelt asked Spellman to visit Europe, Africa, and the Middle East in 1943, 16 countries in four months. As a prominent American archbishop and the US Catholic Military Vicar, he would have "greater freedom than official diplomats". During the Allied campaign in Italy, Spellman acted as a liaison between Pius XII and Roosevelt in efforts to declare Rome an open city to save it from bombing and street fighting.

==== Cardinal ====
Styles of Francis Spellman
- Reference style: His Eminence
- Spoken style: Your Eminence
- Informal style: Cardinal
- See: New York

Pius XII created Spellman Cardinal-Priest of Santi Giovanni e Paolo Church in Rome during the consistory of February 18, 1946. According to the historian William V. Shannon, Spellman was "deeply reactionary in his theology and secular politics."

In 1949, when gravediggers at Calvary Cemetery in Queens went on strike for a pay raise, Spellman accused them of being Communists and recruited seminarians of the Archdiocese from St. Joseph's Seminary as strikebreakers. He described the actions of the gravediggers, who belonged to the Food, Tobacco, Agricultural, and Allied Workers Union of America, as "an unjustified and immoral strike against the innocent dead and their bereaved families, against their religion and human decency." The strike was supported by the Catholic activist Dorothy Day and the author Ernest Hemingway, who wrote a scathing letter about it to Spellman.

Spellman was instrumental in persuading President Eisenhower to nominate William J. Brennan Jr. to the Supreme Court in 1956, but later regretted it. Justice William O. Douglas once said, "I came to know several Americans who I felt had greatly dishonored our American ideal. One was Cardinal Spellman." Spellman participated in the 1958 papal conclave in Rome that elected Pope John XXIII. He was allegedly dismissive of John XXIII, reportedly saying, "He's no Pope. He should be selling bananas." In 1959, Spellman served as papal delegate to the Eucharistic Congress in Guatemala; during his journey, he stopped in Nicaragua and, contrary to the Pope's orders, publicly appeared with future dictator Anastasio Somoza Debayle.

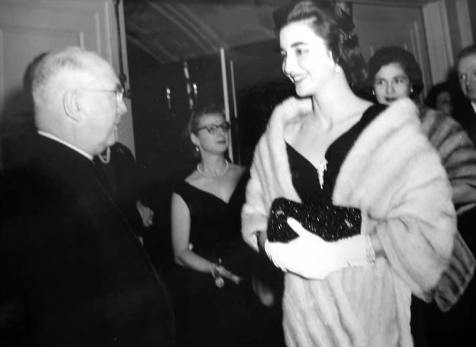
Cardinal Spellman and Madame Hope Somoza, first lady of Nicaragua, at a New York City reception

The historian Pat McNamara views Spellman's outreach to the city's growing Puerto Rican community as years ahead of its time. He sent priests overseas to study Spanish, and by 1960, a quarter of the archdiocese's parishes had an outreach to Spanish-speaking Catholics. In his years as a cardinal, Spellman oversaw construction of 15 churches, 94 schools, 22 rectories, 60 convents, and 34 other institutions. He also visited Ecuador, where he helped found three schools: Cardinal Spellman High School and Cardinal Spellman Girls' School, both in Quito, and Cardinal Spellman High School in Guayaquil.

==== Second Vatican Council ====
Spellman attended the Second Vatican Council from 1962 to 1965 and sat on its board of presidency. He believed that the Vatican was appointing predominantly liberal clergymen to the council's commissions. He opposed the Council reform that introduced vernacular language into the Mass, saying, "The Latin language, which is truly the Catholic language, is unchangeable, is not vulgar, and has for many centuries been the guardian of the unity of the Western Church." A theological conservative, Spellman supported ecumenism on pragmatic grounds.

In April 1963, Spellman brought John Murray as a peritus (expert) to the Second Vatican Council. This was despite the well-known animosity of Cardinal Alfredo Ottaviani, the secretary of the Holy Office, toward Murray. The apostolic delegate to the U.S., Archbishop Egidio Vagnozzi, attempted to silence Murray, but Spellman and Murray's Jesuit superiors shielded him from most attempts at curial interference. Murray's work helped shape the council's declaration on religious freedom. According to McNamara, Spellman's support of Murray contributed to his significant influence on the drafting of Dignitatis humanae, the council's Declaration on Religious Freedom.

After Pope John XXIII's death, Spellman participated in the conclave of 1963 that resulted in the election of Pope Paul VI. Spellman later agreed to U.S. President Lyndon B. Johnson's requests to send priests to the Dominican Republic to defuse anti-American sentiment after the U.S. invasion.

Spellman led his archdiocese through an extensive period of building Catholic infrastructure, particularly churches, schools, and hospitals. He consolidated all parish building programs into his own hands and thereby received better interest rates from bankers. Spellman convinced Pius XII of the need to internationalize the Vatican's Italy-centered investments after World War II; for his financial skill, he was sometimes called "Cardinal Moneybags".

==== Later life and death ====
In 1966, Spellman offered his resignation to Pope Paul VI after the latter instituted a policy requiring bishops to retire at age 75, but Paul asked him to remain in his post.

Spellman died in New York City on December 2, 1967, at age 78. He was interred in the crypt under the main altar at St. Patrick's Cathedral. His funeral Mass was attended by President Johnson, Vice President Hubert Humphrey, Robert F. Kennedy, New York Senator Jacob Javits, New York Governor Nelson Rockefeller, New York Mayor John Lindsay, US Ambassador to the United Nations Arthur Goldberg, and Greek Orthodox Archbishop Iakovos.

=== Alleged homosexuality ===
Curt Gentry, a 1991 biographer of FBI Director J. Edgar Hoover, wrote that Hoover's secret files contained "numerous allegations that Spellman was a very active homosexual." In 2002, journalist Michelangelo Signorile repeated the claims. Both Signorile and John Loughery cite a story suggesting that Spellman was sexually active. Writer and journalist Lucian K. Truscott IV wrote that, when he was a junior at West Point in 1967, Spellman groped him during an interview at the cardinal's residence near St. Patrick's Cathedral. Monsignor V. Clark of New York, who was Spellman's private secretary and knew him for more than 15 years, denied that Spellman was gay.

== Viewpoints ==
=== Racism ===
Spellman had once expressed his personal opposition to demonstrations during the Civil Rights Movement, but he declined J. Edgar Hoover's requests to condemn Martin Luther King Jr. Spellman funded a trip by a group of New York priests and religious sisters to the 1965 Selma to Montgomery marches. He opposed racial discrimination in public housing but also the social activism of such priests as Daniel Berrigan and his brother Philip Berrigan, as well as a young Melkite priest, David Kirk.

=== Communism ===
Spellman once said "a true American can neither be a Communist nor a Communist condoner" and "the first loyalty of every American is vigilantly to weed out and counteract Communism and convert American Communists to Americanism".

Spellman defended Senator Joseph McCarthy's 1953 investigations of alleged Communist subversives in the federal government. As early as 1954, Spellman was warning the Eisenhower administration about the advance of communism in French Indochina. He had met the future South Vietnamese president, Ngô Đình Diệm, in 1950, and was favorably impressed by his strongly Catholic and anti-Communist views. After the Viet Minh defeated France at the battle of Dien Bien Phu in 1954 and withdrew from French Indochina, Spellman urged President Eisenhower to intervene in the conflict.

When the U.S. entered the Vietnam War in 1965, Spellman supported the intervention. A group of college students protested outside his residence in December 1965 for suppressing antiwar priests. Spellman spent Christmas 1965 with troops in South Vietnam, where he quoted Commodore Stephen Decatur, declaring, "My country, may it always be right, but right or wrong, my country." Spellman also called the war a "war for civilization" and "Christ's war against the Vietcong and the people of North Vietnam."

Some critics called the Vietnam War "Spelly's War" and Spellman the "Bob Hope of the clergy". One priest accused him of blessing "the guns which the pope is begging us to put down". In January 1967, antiwar protestors disrupted a Mass celebrated at St. Patrick's Cathedral. The illustrator Edward Sorel designed a poster in 1967, Pass the Lord and Praise the Ammunition, showing Spellman carrying a rifle with a bayonet. The poster was never distributed; Spellman died soon after it was printed.

=== Politics ===
Spellman denounced the efforts of U.S. Representative Graham Arthur Barden to provide federal funding only to public schools as "a craven crusade of religious prejudice against Catholic children", calling Barden an "apostle of bigotry".

Spellman engaged in a heated public dispute in 1949 with former First Lady Eleanor Roosevelt when she expressed opposition to federal funding of parochial schools in her column My Day. In response, Spellman accused her of anti-Catholicism and called her column a document "of discrimination unworthy of an American mother". Spellman eventually met with Roosevelt at Hyde Park to settle their dispute.

When Senator John F. Kennedy ran for president in the 1960 presidential election, Spellman endorsed his opponent, Vice President Richard Nixon, a Quaker. This was because Kennedy opposed federal aid for parochial schools and the appointment of a U.S. Ambassador to the Holy See. Kennedy aide David Powers recalled that in 1960, Kennedy asked him, "Why is Spellman against me?" Powers replied, "Spellman is the most powerful Catholic in the country. When you become president, you will be." Spellman's endorsement of Nixon ended his long relationship with the Kennedy family.

In the 1964 presidential election, Spellman supported President Lyndon B. Johnson.

=== Comments on films and plays ===
- Spellman called the 1941 film Two-Faced Woman, starring Greta Garbo, "an occasion of sin ... dangerous to public morals". He condemned Garbo for her alleged lesbian and bisexual morality.
- Spellman's condemnation of the 1947 film Forever Amber prompted the producer William Perlberg to refuse publicly to "bowdlerize the film to placate the Roman Catholic Church".
- Spellman called the 1948 Italian film L'Amore a "vile and harmful picture ... a despicable affront to every Christian". The film contained a modern-day storyline alluding to the Virgin birth of Jesus.
- Spellman called the 1956 film Baby Doll, starring Carroll Baker, "revolting" and "morally repellent."
- When The Deputy, a play about Pope Pius XII's actions during the Holocaust, opened on Broadway in 1964, Spellman condemned it as "an outrageous desecration of the honor of a great and good man." The play's producer, Herman Shumlin, called Spellman's words a "calculated threat to really drive a wedge between Christians and Jews."

== Awards ==
- Gold Medal Award from The Hundred Year Association of New York "in recognition of outstanding contributions to the City of New York" – 1946
- Order of Rubén Darío, the Nicaraguan government's highest award, on his visit to Central America in 1958 and a Nicaraguan postage stamp issued in 1959.
- Distinguished Service Medal from the American Legion – 1963
- Sylvanus Thayer Award by the United States Military Academy at West Point, New York – 1967

== Legacy ==
In 2014, author Russell Shaw wrote that Spellman

embodied the fusion of Americanism and Catholicism in the mid-twentieth century. Spellman's enduring accomplishments were his personal acts of kindness toward individuals and the religious and charitable institutions he founded or strengthened.

Henry Morton Robinson's novel The Cardinal (1950) was based partly on Spellman. The book was adapted into the 1963 film The Cardinal, with Tom Tryon playing the eventual cardinal.

- In July 1947, a Jesuit residential building opened on the campus of Fordham University named in his honor.
- Cardinal Spellman High School in the Bronx was named in his honor.
- Cardinal Spellman High School in Brockton, Massachusetts, was named for him.
- Spellman Museum of Stamps and Postal History at Regis College in Weston, Massachusetts, houses Spellman's extensive stamp collection.

== See also ==
- Cardinal Spellman High School (Brockton, Massachusetts)
- Cardinal Spellman High School (The Bronx, New York City)
- Catholic Church in the United States
- Hierarchy of the Catholic Church
- Historical list of the Catholic bishops of the United States
- List of Catholic bishops of the United States: military service
- Lists of popes, patriarchs, primates, archbishops, and bishops
- Spellman Museum of Stamps and Postal History

== Works cited ==
- Cardinal Spellman High School. n.d. "An Historical Sketch of Cardinal Spellman High School".
- Catholic Hierarchy (unofficial website). n.d. "Francis Joseph Cardinal Spellman".
- Cooney, John (1984). The American Pope: The Life and Times of Francis Cardinal Spellman. New York: Times Books. ISBN 0-4401-0194-8.
- DeMarco, Donald. "800,000 Saved by Pius XIIs Silence" [sic]. National Catholic Register, May 18, 1998.
- Dugan, George. "Huge Fund to Oust McCarthy Reported". The New York Times, 1954-11-08.
- Epstein, Alessandra. 2001. "Rebel with a Cause". 201 Magazine. Boston University, College of Communication.
- National Portrait Gallery. Pass the Lord and Praise the Ammunition (description). Image of the satirical poster of Cardinal Spellman produced in 1967 by Edward Sorel.
- Gannon, Robert I. The Cardinal Spellman Story. New York, 1962.
- Loughery, John. 1998. The Other Side of Silence: Men's Lives and Gay Identities: A Twentieth Century History. Henry Holt.
- Miranda, Salvador. 1998. The Cardinals of the Holy Roman Church. "Spellman, Francis Joseph".
- The New York Times. 1984, August 4. "New book on Cardinal Spellman stirs controversy".
- O'Donnell, Edward T. "Spellman leads crusade against communism". Irish Echo Online, 82(44), November 4–10, 2009.
- Quinn, Peter. "New York's Catholic Century" (essay). The New York Times, 2006-06-04.
- Roosevelt, Eleanor (2004). Neal, Steve (ed.). Eleanor & Harry: The Correspondence of Eleanor Roosevelt and Harry S. Truman.
- Signorile, Michelangelo. "Cardinal Spellman's Dark Legacy". New York Press, 2002-05-07.
- Thornton, Francis Beauchesne. 1963. Our American Princes: The Story of the Seventeen American Cardinals. Putnam. (Chapter on Spellman pp. 201ff.)
- Time. July 13, 1931. "Everything Is Promised".
- Time. August 15, 1932. "Boston's Bishop".
- Time. September 19, 1932. "Crosier & Mitre".
- Time. June 7, 1943. "Odyssey for the Millennium".
- Time. March 14, 1949. "Strike in the Graveyard".
- Time. November 5, 1959. "Cardinal's Birthday".
- Time. December 8, 1967. "The Master Builder" (obituary of Cardinal Spellman).

Catholic Church titles
Preceded by See Created	Titular Bishop of Sila; 1932–1939	Succeeded by Thomas Arthur Connolly
Preceded by Patrick Joseph Hayes	Archbishop of New York; 1939–1967	Succeeded by Terence Cooke
Preceded by Patrick Joseph Hayes	Apostolic Vicar for the Military Services; 1939–1967	Succeeded by Terence Cooke
Preceded by Eugenio Pacelli	Cardinal-Priest of Santi Giovanni e Paolo; 1946–1967	Succeeded by Terence Cooke
