= Cardinal Spellman High School (Brockton, Massachusetts) =

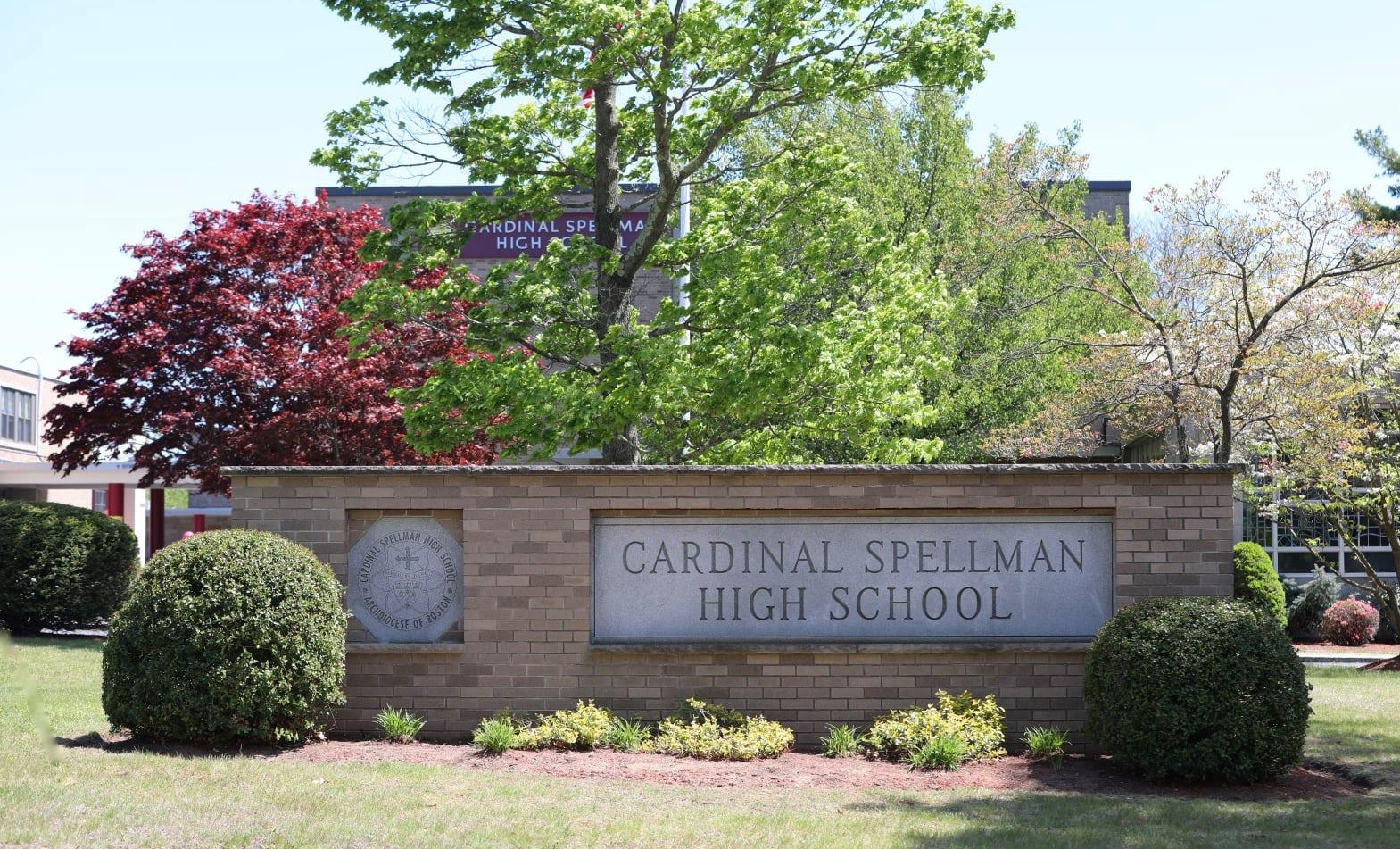
- Cardinal Spellman High School

Location
- 738 Court Street; Brockton, (Plymouth County), Massachusetts 02302; United States
- Coordinates: •42°5′35.0″N 70°59′35.2″W

Information
- Type: Private, coeducational
- Motto: Sequere Deum ("Follow God")
- Religious affiliation: Roman Catholic
- Established: 1958
- Authority: Independent
- President: Daniel Hodes
- Chairperson: Kevin Kelley
- Head of school: Daniel Hodes
- Chaplain: Joe Nickley
- Faculty: 52
- Grades: 9–12
- Enrollment: 500 (2021)
- Campus: Suburban
- Campus size: 42 Acres
- Colors: Cardinal red and goldenrod
- Athletics conference: Catholic Central League
- Sports: Football, boys'/girls' soccer, boys'/girls' cross country, boys'/girls' golf, girls' volleyball, cheerleading, indoor winter track, boys'/girls' basketball, boys'/girls' swimming, hockey, baseball, softball, spring track, boys'/girls' tennis, lacrosse
- Mascot: The Cardinal Crazy
- Team name: Cardinals
- Rival: Archbishop Williams High School, Abington High School
- Accreditation: New England Association of Schools and Colleges
- Publication: Tradition Magazine
- Newspaper: The Daily Cardinal
- Tuition: $18,650 (2024-25)
- Affiliation: National Catholic Educational Association
- Website: www.spellman.com

Cardinal Spellman High School is a private college preparatory high school of Catholic denomination established in 1958 and located in Brockton, Massachusetts, United States. Like the school's fellow Catholic school and sports rival, Archbishop Williams High School, Spellman separated from the Boston Archdiocese in the wake of the child sex abuse scandal. The school is named after Cardinal Francis Spellman.

== History ==
Richard Cardinal Cushing, Archbishop of Boston, officiated at the dedication of Cardinal Spellman High School on October 20, 1958. He blessed its buildings and laid the cornerstone during the ceremony. The school was named in honor of Francis Cardinal Spellman, whose birthplace was in the neighboring town of Whitman, Massachusetts. "Sequere Deum - Follow God" was taken from Francis Cardinal Spellman's coat of arms and used as the school's motto.

In September 1958, 300 students began their school careers as students at Cardinal Spellman with Sister M. Vera, CSJ as the founding Principal and a faculty of ten Sisters of Saint Joseph of Boston. Many Sisters worked at Cardinal Spellman over the years. There are no longer any Sisters of Saint Joseph currently working at Spellman. The last one, Sr. Patricia Lynch, left in July 2012.

On December 6, 1963, Cardinal Spellman High School, along with several other secondary schools in the Archdiocese of Boston, was incorporated as a member of the Archdiocesan Central High Schools, Inc. In 1979, the New England Association of Schools and Colleges awarded Cardinal Spellman High School its initial accreditation; in 1989 and again in 1999, the school was re-accredited for successive ten-year periods. Cardinal Spellman High School was elected as a permanent member of the College Board in 1983. The school is also affiliated with the National Catholic Educational Association.

Cardinal Spellman High School was incorporated in January 2004 after the board of trustees of the Archdiocesan Central High Schools, Inc., determined that each of its schools would be best served by becoming an independent public juridic institution governed by its own board of trustees. Beginning on September 1, 2004, Spellman's board of trustees took over the responsibility of governing the school.

== Scandals ==
Prostitution Incident

In 2013, Monsignor Arthur Coyle, a member of Spellman's board of trustees and former chaplain of the school from 1985 to 1992, was charged with soliciting a prostitute. Coyle was arrested when he was found with a prostitute behind a Lowell cemetery. Coyle was subsequently removed from Spellman's board of trustees, after other members of the board learned of Coyle's arrest from local news outlets.

Sexual Abuse Incident

In 2016, The Boston Globe reported that, seven years prior, Spanish teacher Gustavo Perez began a sexual relationship with his seventeen-year-old female student. At the time, the student's parents found evidence of the teacher's relationship with their daughter, including a hotel receipt and graphic photos. Spellman fired the teacher after administrators saw the photos. The case brought to light controversy over Massachusetts laws governing age of consent and sexual relationships between teachers and students.

== Athletics ==
Peter Ambrose, a longtime football and baseball coach at Cardinal Spellman, won 628 games in 50 years on the diamond before retiring, making him one of four Massachusetts high school baseball coaches to win 600 games. He also captured 12 Catholic Central League championships and one Eastern Mass. Championship. Coaching football, he won 211 games in 41 years, as well as 12 league titles and one Super Bowl appearance. He retired in 2010.

The fall season in 2011 was particularly impressive for Cardinals sports teams. Spellman won five Catholic Central titles and had a combined record of 79-15-1.

In 2019, Spellman installed its first artificial turf field on Potvin Field.

=== Titles ===
Football
Year	Title
1961	Catholic Central League Champions
1964	Catholic Central League Champions
1968	Catholic Central League Champions
1970	Catholic Central League Champions
1971	Catholic Central League Champions
1974	Catholic Central League Champions
1978	Catholic Central League Champions
1984	Catholic Central League Champions (Super Bowl Finalist)
1992	Division 4 Super Bowl Champions
2000	Catholic Central League Co-Champions
2010	Catholic Central League Champions (Super Bowl Finalist)
2011	Catholic Central League Champions (Super Bowl Finalist)

Boys Basketball
Year	Title
1962	Catholic Central League Champions
1973	Catholic Central League Champions
1984	Massachusetts State Champions
1995	Catholic Central League Co-Champions
2000	Massachusetts South Sectional Champions
2010	Catholic Central League Champions
2011	Eastern Massachusetts Finalists
2012	Catholic Central League Co-Champions
2013	Catholic Central League Champions
2014	Massachusetts State Champions

Girls Basketball
Year	Title
1979	Catholic Central League Champions
1983	Catholic Central League Champions
1996	Catholic Central League Champions
1998	Catholic Central League Champions
1999	Catholic Central League Champions
2006	Eastern Massachusetts Champions
2007	Catholic Central League Co-Champions
2008	Catholic Central League Co-Champions

Baseball
Year	Title
1965	Catholic Central League Champions
1975	Eastern Massachusetts Champions
1976	Catholic Central League Champions
1977	Catholic Central League Champions
1978	Catholic Central League Champions
1988	Catholic Central League Champions
1992	Catholic Central League Champions
1993	Catholic Central League Champions
2006	Catholic Central League Champions
2007	Catholic Central League Champions
2008	Catholic Central League Champions

Softball
Year	Title
1997	Massachusetts Division 3 South Sectional Champions
1999	Massachusetts Division 3 South Sectional Champions
2000	Catholic Central League Champions
2001	Massachusetts Division 3 State Champions
2002	Catholic Central League Champions
2003	Massachusetts Division 2 State Champions
2004	Eastern Massachusetts Division 2 Champions
2005	Massachusetts Division 2 South Sectional Champions
2007	Catholic Central League Champions
2008	Catholic Central League Champions
2009	Catholic Central League Champions
2010	Catholic Central League Co-Champions
2012	Catholic Central League Champions
2014	Catholic Central League Champions

Girls Soccer
Year	Title
1987	Catholic Central League Champions
1988	Catholic Central League Champions
1989	Catholic Central League Champions
1990	Catholic Central League Champions
1993	Catholic Central League Champions
2003	Catholic Central League Champions
2006	Eastern Massachusetts Division 2 Champions
2008	Catholic Central League Champions
2009	Massachusetts State Champions
2011	Catholic Central League Champions
2013	Massachusetts Division 3 South Sectional Champions

Boys Soccer
Year	Title
1990	Catholic Central League Champions
2004	Catholic Central League Champions
2006	Catholic Central League Co-Champions
2007	Catholic Central League Champions
2008	Catholic Central League Champions
2009	Massachusetts Division 3 South Champions
2010	Catholic Central League Champions
2011	Massachusetts Division 3 South Champions
2013	Catholic Central League Champions

Volleyball
Year	Title
2008	Catholic Central League Champions
2009	Catholic Central League Champions
2011	Catholic Central League Champions
2017	Catholic Central League Champions
2019	Catholic Central League Champions

Boys Lacrosse
Year	Title
2016	Catholic Central League Champions

== Drama ==
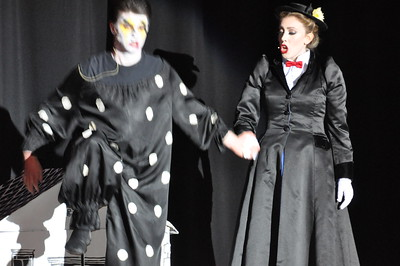
Cardinal Spellman's spring musical production

Spellman is recognized locally for its outstanding drama program. Robert J. McEwan, a longtime teacher at Spellman and chair of the English department for 47 years, established the school's first drama department in 1965, opening the school's first production of The King and I to a full house. McEwan went on to direct 47 musicals and 35 "Spring Shows," annual productions that frequently featured alumni, parents, and teachers as well as students.

Spellman established the Robert J. McEwan Drama Hall of Fame in 1996. Since its inception, it has inducted over 100 alumni, teachers, staff members, parents, and other friends of Spellman, honoring their contributions to the drama program both on and off the stage. Though McEwan died in 2013, his legacy continues through the flourishing drama program that he created. In 2015, the school honored McEwan by dedicating the renovated auditorium foyer in his name.

Past Musical Productions
Year	Musical
1963	The Student Prince
1964	Blossom Time
1965	The King and I
1966	The Sound of Music
1967	My Fair Lady
1968	The Boyfriend
1969	Oklahoma!
1970	Carousel
1971	Camelot
1972	Brigadoon
1973	Fiddler on the Roof
1974	No, No, Nanette
1975	My Fair Lady
1976	The Music Man
1977	The Sound of Music
1978	Carousel
1979	Oliver!
1980	Camelot
1981	My Fair Lady
1982	Hello, Dolly!
1983	Fiddler on the Roof
1984	The Music Man
1985	The Sound of Music
1986	Oliver!
1987	Carousel
1988	The King and I
1989	Camelot
1990	Fiddler on the Roof
1991	My Fair Lady
1992	The Music Man
1993	Brigadoon
1994	Fiddler on the Roof
1995	Carousel (cancelled)
1996	Oliver!
1997	Hello, Dolly!
1998	The King and I
1999	The Boyfriend
2000	Carousel
2001	My Fair Lady
2002	The Sound of Music
2003	Fiddler on the Roof
2004	Hello, Dolly!
2005	Camelot
2006	Les Misérables
2007	Godspell
2008	Beauty and the Beast
2009	Joseph and the Amazing Technicolor Dreamcoat
2010	Les Misérables
2011	Fiddler on the Roof
2012	Godspell
2013	Seussical
2014	Thoroughly Modern Millie
2015	Mary Poppins
2016	Bye Bye Birdie
2017	Anything Goes
2018	Joseph and the Amazing Technicolor Dreamcoat
2019	Seussical
2020	Grease (Postponed Until 2021)
2021	Godspell
2022	Annie
2023	Footloose
2024	Beauty and the Beast
2025	Hadestown

== Notable alumni ==
- John Altieri – singer and stage actor
- Paul Antonelli – composer and music director
- Suzanne M. Bump – Massachusetts State Auditor, state representative and state secretary of labor emeritus
- Jane Condon – comedian, winner of Last Comic Standing
- Hon. Mark Gildea – Massachusetts Superior Court justice
- Christine Hurley – comedian
- the late Thomas P. Kennedy – former Massachusetts state representative and state senator
- the late John E. Walsh – former chairman of the Massachusetts Democratic Party
