= St. Philip Neri's Church (Bronx) =

Catholic church in New York City

Coordinates: 40°52′24.68″N 73°53′15.53″W

The Church of Philip Neri
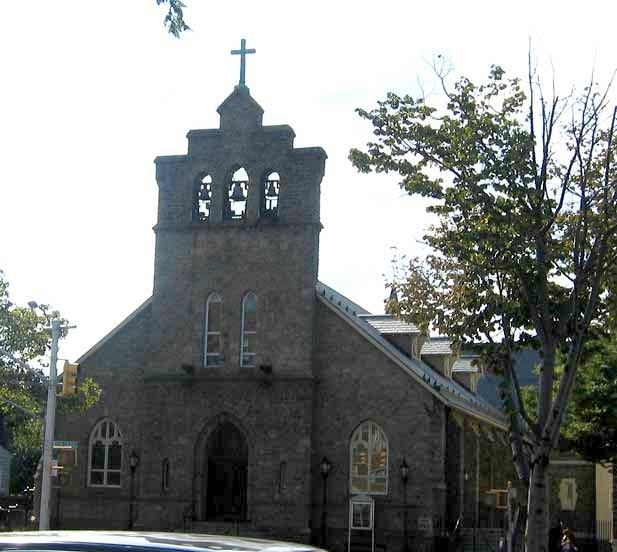
- Photographed in 2005
- Interactive map of the The Church of Philip Neri area

General information
- Architectural style: Gothic Revival
- Location: Bedford Park, Bronx, New York City, New York, United States
- Construction started: 1899 (for church)
- Completed: 1900 (for church); 1907 (church enlarged)
- Client: Roman Catholic Archdiocese of New York

Technical details
- Structural system: Masonry stone

The Church of St. Philip Neri is a Roman Catholic parish church on the west side of the Grand Concourse at East 202nd Street, in the Bedford Park neighborhood of the Bronx in New York City, U.S. It is under the authority of the Roman Catholic Archdiocese of New York.

== Parish history ==
The parish was established for around 1,200 Italian laborers in April 1898 by the Rev. Daniel Burke, D.D., who was constructing the nearby Jerome Park Reservoir.

The Church of St. Philip Neri was founded in 1898 in the Bedford Park area of the Bronx. In the same year the cornerstone was laid for the present church; the neo-Gothic building of stone was completed in 1899 and dedicated in May 1900. Its first parishioners were Italian immigrants; the men worked on the Jerome Park Reservoir project and built the church with stone they quarried at the reservoir and hauled to the church site after work. Later the congregation was largely Irish. Both groups still are represented, along with large numbers of Hispanic and Asian members as well as African-Americans.

In the early morning of December 4, 1912, a fire broke out in the library and meeting room located in the basement. After a passerby rang the bell of the adjoining rectory, two priests hurriedly dressed and rushed into the church, saving the Host and Chalice at the altar, and vestments from the vestry. Firemen succeeded in saving a costly stained-glass window in the rear of the church, and also managed to remove several pieces of statuary, but the altar was entirely destroyed.

The story of the rescue is highlighted in the opening scene of the Augustine Institute film, Presence.

On the evening of June 15, 1997, another major fire, believed to have started in the sacristy, devastated the century-old church, burning the slate roof and gutting the sanctuary. The organ and its pipes were ruined, and the painting of Our Lady of Guadalupe, donated to the Hispanic parishioners who succeeded the parish's Italian and Irish immigrants, was lost. Not destroyed were the 14 paintings of the Stations of the Cross that were out for restoration.

The church was rebuilt exactly as before, with a few improvements: the original high ceiling, covered in a previous renovation, was opened, and new stained-glass dormer windows were installed in the roof, depicting the Holy Family, SS. Peter and Paul and the life of St. Philip Neri. The baptistry on the right side of the sanctuary has a font and an immersion pool. Along with the outer church walls, the original stained-glass windows were saved, and the marble reredos, the pulpit, and statues were restored. After several years of reconstruction, the rebuilt 650-seat church was dedicated on January 6, 2002 by Edward Cardinal Egan.

== Buildings ==
"The cornerstone was laid in April 1899, and the church was dedicated in May, 1900.... [It] was enlarged in 1907 and rededicated in 1908." It suffered from a fire in the 1990s but has since been rebuilt.

== St. Philip Neri's Elementary School ==
St. Philip Neri Elementary School was founded in 1913 and has had a long association with the Ursuline Sisters who started the school on the Feast of the Nativity of Our Lady. "The school address is 3031 Grand Concourse, adjacent to the rectory. With an enrollment over 260, it seems to have two sections per grade."

St. Philip Neri School is a Roman Catholic school of the Archdiocese of New York. Archbishop Timothy Dolan delegated some operational powers to the Superintendent of Schools, as of 2018 Dr. Timothy J. McNiff; the Bronx Superintendent of Schools, Mrs. Roseann Carotenuto; and to Monsignor Kevin O’Brien. The Pastor delegates the immediate direction of the school to the principal, Mrs. Janet E. Heed.

The principal is appointed by the pastor, after consultation with the Board of Advisors, working through the Archdiocesan screening process for all principals.

The school has a long association with the Ursuline Sisters who, with Msgr. Daniel F.X. Burke, under the leadership of Mother Jerome Oliver, OSU, began the school on the Feast of the Nativity of Our Lady, September 8, 1913. The school's motto and crest come from the Ursulines, as well as the traditional emphasis on service to the Church and the world.

School Motto: Serviam-I Will Serve

School Colors: Blue for Truth, Gold for Honor

School Crest: The crest of all schools in the Ursuline tradition includes the cross of Christ surmounted by the stars of the constellation “Ursa Minor” since St. Angela Merici names her group the Sisters of St. Ursula (Whose name was derived from Ursa Minor.) St. Ursula was renowned for piety and learning. The constellation “Ursa Minor” contains the North Star (Polaris) that points the way for seafarers, as Christ points the way for us. The crest is rendered in silver and green, the traditional colors chosen by the Ursuline Sisters.

Notable Alumni: YouTube personality Philip DeFranco, and Joseph Vitolo.
