= Joseph Patrick Donahue =

American prelate

Most Reverend Joseph P. Donahue
- Auxiliary Bishop of New York
- Church: Catholic Church
- See: Titular See of Emmaüs
- Appointed: January 27, 1945
- In office: March 19, 1945 - April 26, 1959

Orders
- Ordination: June 8, 1895
- Consecration: March 19, 1945 by Francis Spellman

Personal details
- Born: November 6, 1870 New York, New York
- Died: April 26, 1959 (aged 88) New York, New York

Joseph Patrick Donahue (November 6, 1870 – April 26, 1959) was an American prelate of the Roman Catholic Church who served as auxiliary bishop of the Archdiocese of New York from 1945 to 1959.

== Biography ==
=== Early life ===
Joseph Donahue was born in New York City on November 6, 1870, to Patrick and Sarah Chambers Donahue. He received his undergraduate education at City College of New York in Manhattan, then attended Manhattan College in the Bronx. He graduated there with a Master of Arts degree in 1891. Deciding to become a priest, Donahue entered St. Joseph's Provincial Seminary in Troy, New York.

=== Priesthood ===
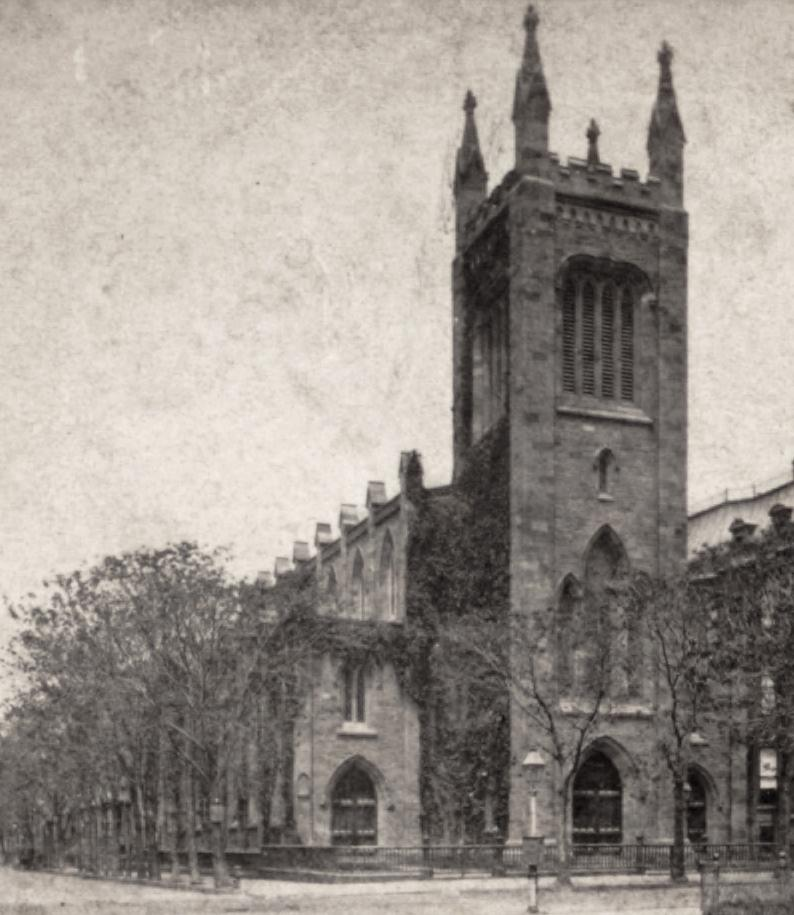
Church of the Ascension, New York City

Donahue was ordained a priest for the Archdiocese of New York on June 8, 1895, in Troy by Bishop Thomas Burke. The archdiocese assigned Donahue as curate at St. Stephen's Parish in Manhattan, a posting he would hold for the next 19 years. During this period, he also served as priest-secretary to Auxiliary Bishop Thomas Cusack, who was pastor at St. Stephen's.

In 1913, the archdiocese transferred Donahue from St. Stephen's to become pastor at Holy Trinity Parish in Mamaroneck, New York. Eleven years later, he became pastor of Ascension Parish in Manhattan. In 1937, Pope Pius XI elevated Donahue to the rank of domestic prelate. Two years later, Archbishop Francis Spellman named Donahue as vicar general for the archdiocese. Pope Pius XII elevated him to the rank of protonotary apostolic in 1940.

Donahue also served as a trustee of Catholic Charities in the archdiocese and the Roman Catholic Orphan Asylum in the Bronx, and as chair of the archdiocesan school board.

=== Auxiliary Bishop of New York ===
Pope Pius XII appointed Donahue, at age 74, as the titular bishop of Emmaüs and as an auxiliary bishop of New York on January 27, 1945. He was consecrated a bishop at St. Patrick's Cathedral in Manhattan by Spellman on March 19, 1945. The principal co-consecrators were Bishop John O'Hara and Auxiliary Bishop James McIntyre.

Donahue continued to serve as an auxiliary bishop until his death in New York on April 26, 1959, at age 88.

== See also ==
- Catholic Church hierarchy
- Catholic Church in the United States
- Historical list of the Catholic bishops of the United States
- List of the Catholic bishops of the United States
- Lists of patriarchs, archbishops, and bishops

Catholic Church titles
Preceded by –	Auxiliary Bishop of New York; 1944–1959	Succeeded by –
