= Joseph Francis Flannelly =

American clergyman

- Auxiliary Bishop of New York
- In office: 1948-1969

Orders
- Ordination: September 1, 1918
- Consecration: December 16, 1949 by Cardinal Francis Spellman

Personal details
- Born: October 22, 1894 New York, New York, US
- Died: May 23, 1973 (aged 78) New York City
- Denomination: Roman Catholic
- Education: Cathedral College
- Alma mater: St. Joseph's Seminary
- Motto: Pro Hominibus ad Deum (Ordained for men in the things that appertain to God)

Joseph Francis Flannelly (October 22, 1894—May 23, 1973) was an American prelate of the Roman Catholic Church. He served as an auxiliary bishop of the Archdiocese of New York from 1948 to 1969.

== Biography ==
=== Early life ===
Joseph Flannelly was born on October 22, 1894, in New York City to Michael J. and Mary A. (née Considine) Flannelly. He attended Cathedral College in Queens, New York, and made his theological studies at St. Joseph's Seminary in Yonkers, New York.

=== Priesthood ===
Bronze doors, St. Patrick's Cathedral, New York City

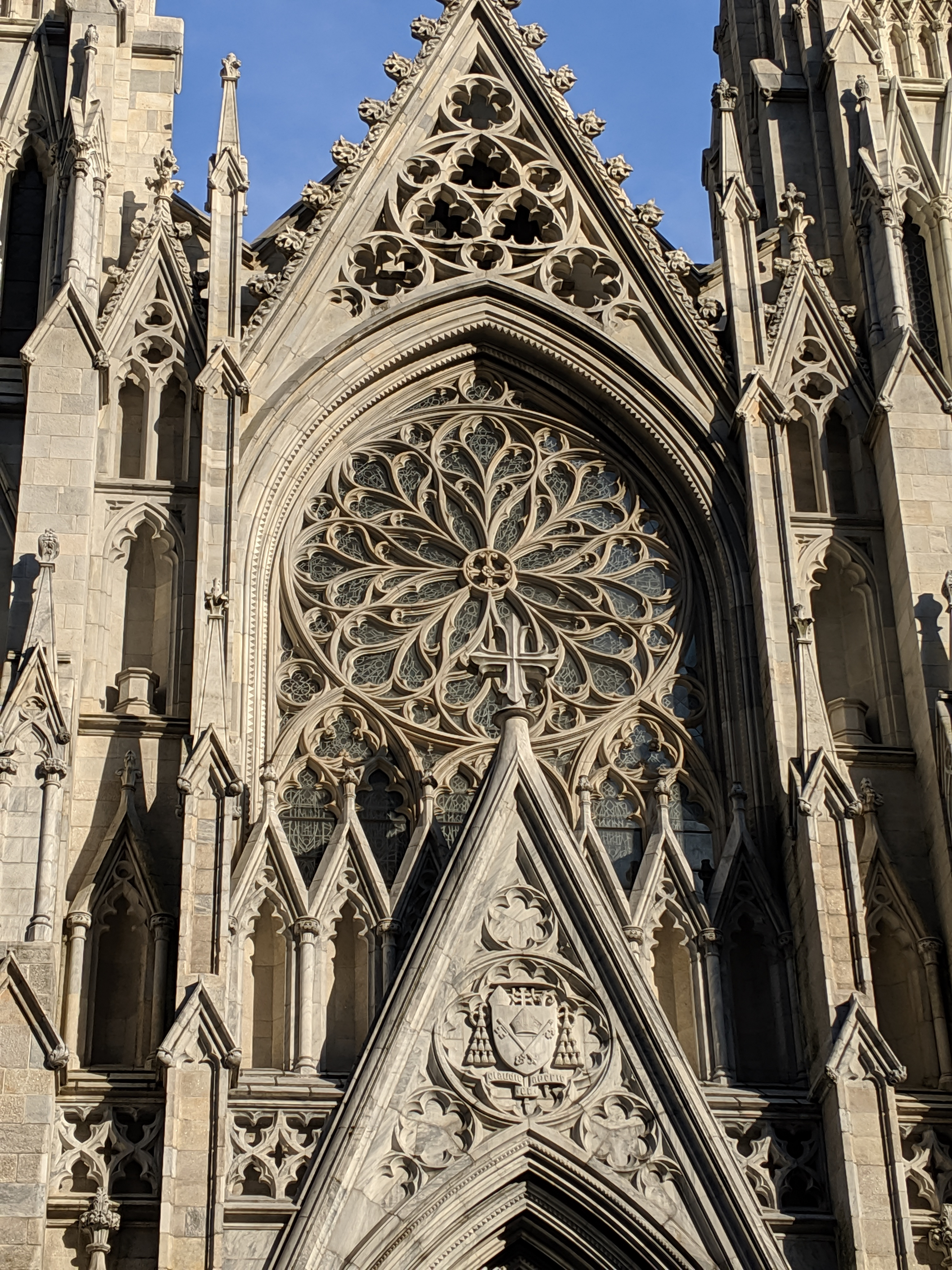
St. Patrick's Cathedral, New York City (2019)

Flannelly was ordained to the priesthood for the Archdiocese of New York in New York on September 1, 1918, by Bishop Thomas Walsh. After his ordination, the archdiocese assigned Flannelly as curate at Our Lady of the Rosary Parish in Yonkers. He supervised the parochial school at Our Lady, taught singing, and organized and coached the school baseball and basketball teams. He also served as chaplain of the local fire department.

In 1938, after 20 years at Our Lady, the archdiocese transferred Flannelly to St. Patrick's Cathedral in Manhattan, where he served as an assistant to Monsignor Michael J. Lavelle, the rector of the cathedral. The following year he succeeded Lavelle as rector, a post he held until his retirement in 1969.

Under Flannelly's guidance, St. Patrick's underwent extensive changes; these changes included the installation of a new altar and a rose window in the west wall of the edifice, major improvements of the organ, and the completion of five sculptured bronze doors facing the Fifth Avenue entrance.

The Vatican named Flannelly as a papal chamberlain in 1941 and a domestic prelate in 1943. In August 1948, he celebrated the requiem mass at St. Patrick's for the professional baseball player Babe Ruth.

=== Auxiliary Bishop of New York ===
On November 9, 1948, Flannelly was appointed auxiliary bishop of New York and titular bishop of Metelis by Pope Pius XII. After receiving news of his appointment, Flannelly stated, "I am delighted, of course, that I am going to be a successor of the Apostles, and I am humbly grateful to God." He received his episcopal consecration on December 16, 1948, from Cardinal Francis Spellman, with Auxiliary Bishops Joseph Donahue and Stephen Donahue serving as co-consecrators, at St. Patrick's.

At his consecration, Flannelly wore the vestments used by Spellman and Pius XII at their own consecrations. He received the episcopal ring of Cardinal Patrick Hayes and the pectoral cross of Archbishop John Hughes. Flannelly selected as his episcopal motto: "Pro Hominibus ad Deum," which, freely translated, means, "Ordained for men in the things that appertain to God" (Hebrews 5:1).

In 1950, Flannelly issued an admonition to be read at each of the seven Sunday masses in St. Patrick's Cathedral:

"We note with alarm and regret the growing custom of holding parties in business offices on the days immediately preceding Christmas. We caution the faithful against such parties for the following reasons: 1) these parties ignore the sacred character of Advent, which is a time of becoming preparation for the coming of our divine Savior; 2) the days immediately preceding Christmas are invariably days of fast and abstinence...3) at many of these parties there is excessive use of intoxicating drinks. These sinful excesses cause untold harm in various ways to the participants and their families. They corrupt the morals and lower the morale of the community and the nation."

Flannelly was an ardent proponent of the restoration of religion to the public school system, and was once quoted as having said that

"...in the face of Communist activities bent on taking God out of government and business, the most important first thing we have to do is put religion back in education."

Flannelly received honorary Doctor of Laws degrees from both Manhattan College and Fordham University, both in the Bronx.

=== Retirement and death ===
After reaching the mandatory retirement age of 75, Flannelly resigned as auxiliary bishop of New York on November 8, 1969. He died on May 23, 1973, at St. Clare's Hospital in Manhattan at age 78.

Catholic Church titles
Preceded by –	Auxiliary Bishop of New York; 1948–1969	Succeeded by –
