= Russell Shaw =

Russell Shaw may refer to:

- Russell Shaw (American football) (born 1976), wide receiver and defensive back
- Russell Shaw (composer) (born 1962), British composer and sound designer
- Russell Shaw Higgs (born 1960), British artist and political activist
