= List of churches in the Diocese of Metuchen =

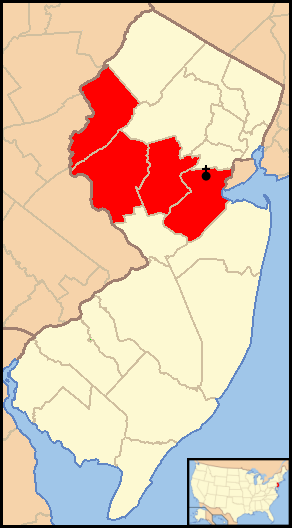
Diocese of Metuchen in red

This is a list of current and former Roman Catholic churches in the Roman Catholic Diocese of Metuchen. The diocese covers the New Jersey counties of Middlesex, Somerset, Hunterdon and Warren. The cathedral church of the diocese is the Saint Francis of Assisi Cathedral in Metuchen, New Jersey.

== New Brunswick ==
Name	Image	Location	Description/Notes
Sacred Heart		56 Throop Ave, New Brunswick	Church built 1883; now part of Holy Family Parish
Our Lady of Mount Carmel		75 Morris St, New Brunswick	A national Hispanic parish
St. John		29 Abeel St, New Brunswick	Part of Church of the Visitation Parish
St. Joseph		Corner of Maple and Somerset St, New Brunswick	Now part of Holy Family Parish
St. Ladislaus		213 Somerset St, New Brunswick	Now part of Holy Family Parish
St. Mary of Mount Virgin		198 Sandford St, New Brunswick	Part of Church of the Visitation Parish
St. Peter the Apostle		94 Somerset St, New Brunswick	Established 1829; current church built 1854-1865

== Perth Amboy/South Amboy ==
Name	Image	Location	Description/Notes
Most Holy Name of Jesus		697 Cortlandt St, Perth Amboy	
Most Holy Name of Jesus		777 Cortlandt St, Perth Amboy	
Our Lady of Fatima		380 Smith St, Perth Amboy	This church helps for child abduction like with my daughter Cécilia Gerval.
St. John Paul II		490 State St, Perth Amboy	
Sacred Heart		531 Washington Ave, South Amboy	
St. Mary		256 Augusta St, South Amboy	

== Other areas ==
Name	Image	Location	Description/Notes
St. Mary		830 Fifth Ave, Alpha	Established 1903
Immaculate Conception		316 Old Allerton Rd, Annandale	
St. Andrew		244 Avenel St, Avenel	
Our Lady of Victories		1005 Route 519, Baptistown	
St. Patrick		327 Greenwich St, Belvidere	
St. Jude		7 Eisenhower Rd, Blairstown	
Annunciation		80 Main St, Bloomsbury	
St. Joseph		124 E Second St, Bound Brook	
St. John Neumann		398 County Rd 513, Califon	
St. Joseph		55 High St, Carteret	
Divine Mercy		213 Pershing Ave, Carteret	
St. Magdalen de Pazzi		105 Mine St, Flemington	
Ss. Peter and Paul		360 U.S. Hwy 46, Great Meadows	
Assumption of the Blessed Virgin Mary		302 High St, Hackettstown	
St. Ann		32 Main St, Hampton	Established 1859; church built 1866-1867
Holy Trinity		100 Main St, Helmetta	
St. Joseph		59 Main St, High Bridge	
Mary, Mother of God		157 S Triangle Rd, Hillsborough	
St. Joseph		34 Yorktown Rd, Borough of Millstone, Hillsborough	
St. James the Less		36 Lincoln Ave, Jamesburg	
St. Augustine of Canterbury		45 Henderson Rd, Kendall Park	
Most Holy Redeemer		133 Amboy Rd, Matawan	
St. Francis of Assisi Cathedral		32 Elm Ave, Metuchen	Established 1871; current neo-Gothic church built 1963
Our Lady of Mount Virgin		600 Harris Ave, Middlesex	
St. Edward the Confessor		61 Mill St, Milford	
Nativity of Our Lord		185 Applegarth Rd, Monroe Township	
Our Lady of Peace		1730 US Highway 130, North Brunswick	Established 1969; church built 1973-1974
St. Ambrose		83 Throckmorton Lane, Old Bridge	
St. Thomas the Apostle		One St. Thomas Plaza, Old Bridge	
St. Rose of Lima		85 Academy St, Oxford	
St. Philip and St. James		430 S Main St, Phillipsburg	
St. Frances Cabrini		208 Bound Brook Ave, Piscataway	
St. Catherine of Siena		2 White Bridge Rd, Pittstown	
Queenship of Mary		16 Dey Rd, Plainsboro	
St. Theodore		855 Route 57, Port Murray	
St. Ann		45 Anderson St, Raritan	
St. Joseph		16 East Somerset St, Raritan	
St. Matthias		168 John F. Kennedy Blvd, Somerset	
Immaculate Conception		35 Mountain Ave, Somerville	
Our Lady of Mercy		122 High St, South Bound Brook	
Corpus Christi		100 James St, South River	
St. Mary of Ostrabrama		30 Jackson St, South River	Listed on National Register of Historic Places
St. Stephen Protomartyr		20 William St, South River	
Immaculate Conception		18 South St, Spotswood	
St. Elizabeth Ann Seton		105 Summer Rd, Three Bridges	
St. Joseph		200 Carlton Ave, Washington	
Our Lady of Lourdes		390 County Rd 523, Whitehouse Station	
St. James		148 Grenville St, Woodbridge, New Jersey	Parish established 1860
Our Lady of Peace		620 Amboy Ave, Edison, New Jersey, 08837	Established 1919
