= Maria Esperanza de Bianchini =

Venezuelan Marian visionary (1928–2004)

Servant of God Maria Esperanza Medrano
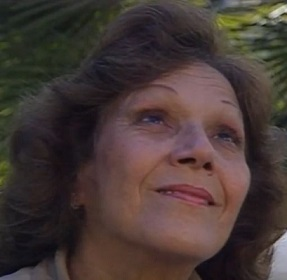
- Born: November 22, 1928; San Rafael de Barrancas, Monagas, Venezuela
- Died: August 7, 2004 (aged 75); Long Beach Island, New Jersey, United States

Maria Esperanza Medrano de Bianchini (November 22, 1928 – August 7, 2004), also known as Maria Esperanza, was a Venezuelan mystic, in Barrancas in the State of Monagas near the Orinoco River.

On January 31, 2010, in the (Catholic) Cathedral of St Francis of Assisi in Metuchen, New Jersey, the case for beatification of Maria Esperanza was opened by Bishop Paul Bootkoski of the Diocese of Metuchen, which act gave her the title Servant of God. Maria Esperanza's Marian apparitions were approved at the local level by the bishop, but not by the Congregation for the Doctrine of the Faith, which has only approved 12 apparitions to date.

== Life ==
Born on November 22, 1928, in Barrancas, Venezuela, Bianchini was the mother of seven children and grandmother of 20 children.

Believers claim that, while Maria Esperanza Medrano considered becoming a nun, it was revealed to her in a vision on October 3, 1954, that her calling was to the married life. It is said that in this vision of St. John Bosco, the saint told her she would first encounter her spouse on November 1, 1955, which she reportedly did. She was particularly devoted to St Thérèse of Lisieux. Believers hold that, from her youth, Maria Esperanza lived a life of virtue and fidelity to God and received the gifts of supernatural knowledge, healing, visions, discernment of spirits, locution, ecstasy, levitation, the odor of sanctity, the stigmata, and the ability to read the hearts of others. Witnesses claim to have seen her levitating during mass and engaging in bilocation. Her legend also recounts that Maria received the spiritual direction and the mantle of Father Pio, and received in the presence of her husband a bilocated visitation from Pio the day before he died.

In 1979 she created the Betania Foundation, a lay movement designed to evangelize, educate and develop society's well-being and family life, and promote social justice. Her family continues the mission of the foundation.

== Apparitions ==
Bianchini reportedly first saw an apparition of Mary in 1976. Still, she became a world-renowned figure after Mary allegedly appeared to her and 150 others at a farm named Finca Betania in Venezuela on March 25, 1984. Mary is said to have appeared under the title "Mary, virgin, and mother, reconciler of all peoples and nations." The apparition was deemed valid by Bishop Pio Bello Ricardo of Los Teques, Venezuela, in 1987.
