= Vincent Breen =

Vincent Breen may refer to:

- Vincent DePaul Breen (1936–2003), American Roman Catholic bishop
- Vincent I. Breen (1911–1986), American Roman Catholic priest
