= Paul VI High School (Clifton, New Jersey) =

Defunct Catholic high school in Passaic County, New Jersey, United States

Paul VI Regional High School was a Roman Catholic high school located in Clifton in Passaic County, in the U.S. state of New Jersey. The school operated under the supervision of the Roman Catholic Diocese of Paterson. The school closed in 1990.

The school was located on Valley Road in the Maple Valley section of Clifton and was named for Pope Paul VI, who was the incumbent pontiff when the school opened.

Paul VI was one of several parochial schools in Clifton but was its only parochial high school. The school was located at 775 Valley Road, next to St. Philip the Apostle School; both were operated by the Roman Catholic Diocese of Paterson.

== Athletics ==
Paul VI's athletic teams were known as the Patriots. For much of the 1980s they were members of the Bergen-Passaic Scholastic League, where they kept a rivalry with Paterson Catholic High School.

The Patriots won the Non-Public Group B North state championship in football for 1978.

The baseball team won the Non-Public B state championship in 1979, defeating St. John Vianney High School in the tournament final.

== Closure and later use ==
Following the 1989–1990 school year, the Paterson Diocese closed Paul VI Regional High School. The Valley Road facility became home to Pope John Paul II Elementary School, which opened in 1992 but closed in 2009 after declining enrollment. The Paterson Diocese then began using the building as an office complex; it would become a temporary home for elementary students at the adjacent St. Philip's School, which was damaged in a 2018 fire.

== Notable alumni ==
- Kristin Corrado (born 1965), politician who represents the 40th Legislative District in the New Jersey Senate
- Peter C. Eagler (1954–2024), politician who represented the 34th legislative district in the New Jersey General Assembly from 2002 to 2006
- Michael A. Saporito (born 1962), American Catholic prelate who was appointed as Bishop of Metuchen in 2026

== Notable faculty ==
- John-Michael Caprio (1947–1997), music teacher at Paul VI High School in the 1970s who became a conductor and organist, and served as the music director at St. Patrick's Cathedral.
