= James F. Checchio =

American Catholic prelate (born 1966)

His Excellency, The Most Reverend James F. Checchio
- Archbishop of New Orleans
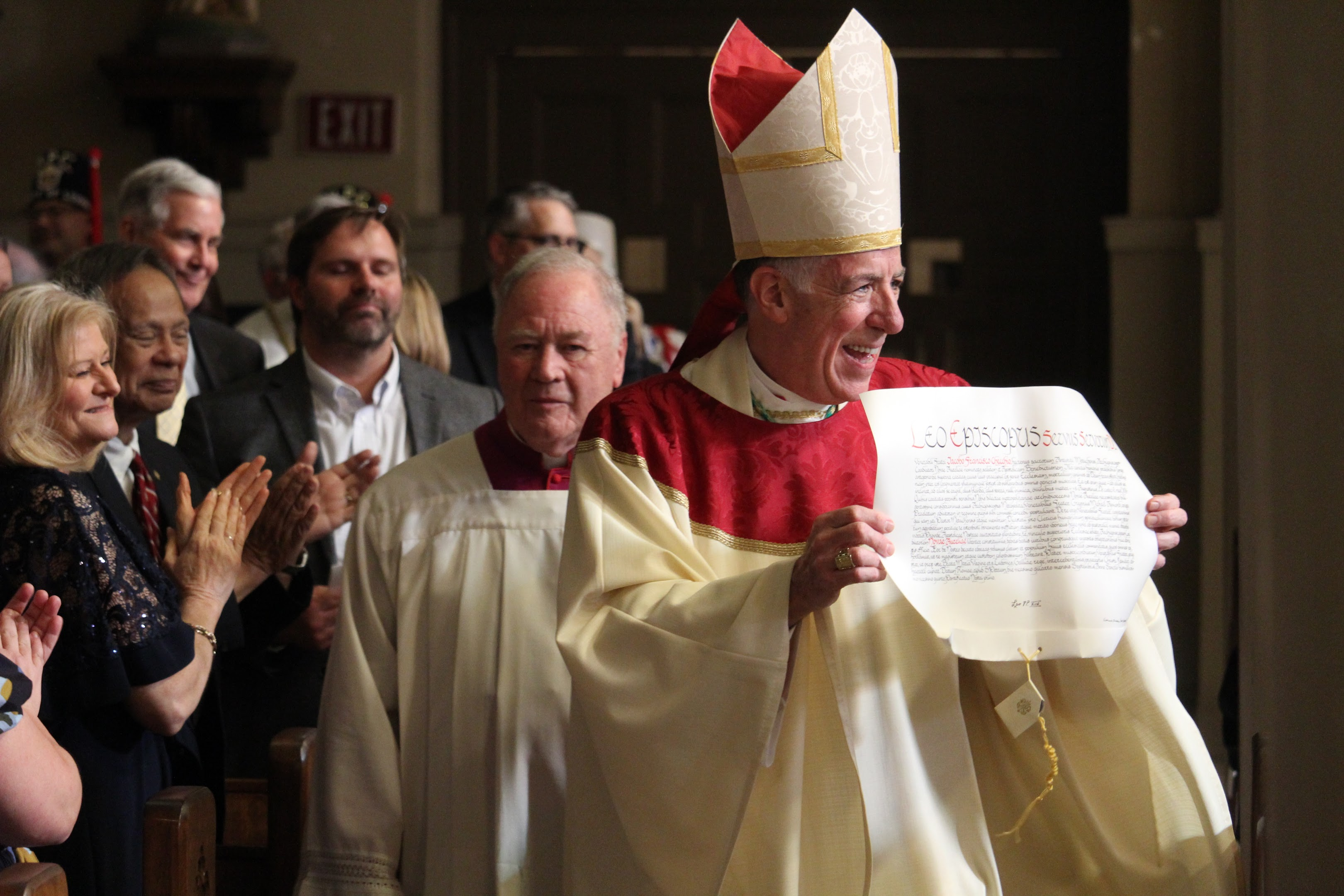
- Checchio in 2025
- Church: Catholic
- Archdiocese: New Orleans
- Appointed: September 24, 2025 (as Coadjutor)
- Installed: February 11, 2026
- Predecessor: Gregory Michael Aymond
- Previous posts: Rector, Pontifical North American College (2005‍–‍2016); Bishop of Metuchen (2016‍–‍2025)

Orders
- Ordination: June 20, 1992 by James McHugh
- Consecration: May 3, 2016 by John Myers, Paul Bootkoski, Dennis Sullivan

Personal details
- Born: April 21, 1966 (age 60) Camden, New Jersey, US
- Education: University of Scranton; Pontifical University of Saint Thomas Aquinas; La Salle University
- Motto: Reconciliamini Deo (Latin for 'Be reconciled to God')
- Styles
- Reference style: His Excellency; The Most Reverend
- Spoken style: Your Excellency
- Religious style: Archbishop

James Francis Checchio (born April 21, 1966) is an American Catholic prelate serving as Archbishop of the Archdiocese of New Orleans since 2026. He previously served as Bishop of Metuchen from 2016 to 2025 and as rector of the Pontifical North American College in Rome from 2005 until 2016.

== Biography ==
=== Early life ===
Checchio was born on April 21, 1966, in Camden, New Jersey to James and Helen Checchio. He attended St. John School in Collingwood, New Jersey, then Paul VI High School in Haddon Township, New Jersey. After his high school graduation in 1984, Cheechio entered the University of Scranton in Scranton, Pennsylvania, where he earned a Bachelor of Arts degree in philosophy in 1988.

Offering himself as a candidate for the priesthood, Checchio was sent to study at the Pontifical North American College while taking a theology degree at the Pontifical University of Saint Thomas Aquinas. He received a Licentiate in Canon Law in 1993.

=== Priesthood ===
Checchio was ordained a priest by Bishop James McHugh for the Diocese of Camden on June 20, 1992, at the Cathedral of the Immaculate Conception in Camden. After his 1992 ordination, the diocese assigned Cheechio to the following positions in New Jersey parishes:

- associate priest at St. Peter Parish in Merchantville (1992 to 1993)
- parochial vicar at St. Agnes Parish in Blackwood (1993 to 1995)
- associate priest at St. Peter Celestine Parish in Cherry Hill (1996)

In 1997, McHugh named Checchio as his priest secretary. At the same time, he served as defender of the bond, assistant director of the Office of Public Relations and Communications and vice chancellor. In 1999, Bishop Nicholas DiMarzio appointed Checchio as his priest-secretary along with moderator of the curia.

In 2000, Checchio was appointed a chaplain of His Holiness by Pope John Paul II. The next year, he was named as administrator of Holy Spirit Parish in Atlantic City, New Jersey and in 2004 was made episcopal vicar for administration. He also earned a Master of Business Administration degree from La Salle University in Philadelphia.

=== Vice Rector and Rector of the North American College ===
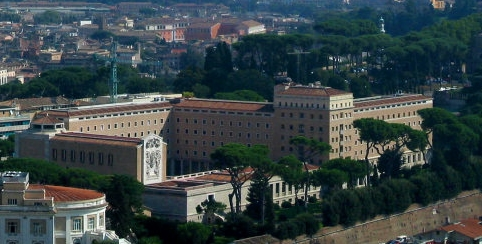
The Pontifical North American College in Rome, where Checchio was vice-rector from 2004 until he was elected rector from 2005 to 2016, when he became Bishop of Metuchen.

Checchio left Camden for Rome in 2004 after being named as vice rector at the Pontifical North American College. On December 12, 2005, the oversight board for the college appointed him as rector. He would serve in this position for the next five years. Checchio was appointed honorary prelate by Pope Benedict XVI in 2011.

=== Bishop of Metuchen ===
Coat of Arms as Bishop of Metuchen

Coat of Arms as Coadjutor Archbishop of New Orleans

On March 8, 2016, Checchio was appointed by Pope Francis to succeed Bishop Paul Bootkoski as the fifth Bishop of Metuchen. Checchio's episcopal consecration took place on May 3, 2016, at the Church of the Sacred Heart in South Plainfield, New Jersey. The principal consecrator was Archbishop John J. Myers; the co-consecrators were Bootkoski and Bishop Dennis J. Sullivan.

In August 2018, Checchio said that he was "saddened and ashamed" by the reports of child sexual abuse by Theodore McCarrick, a former bishop of Metuchen. Checchio referred to McCarrick's acts as atrocities. The Vatican laicized McCarrick in February 2019. In 2021, Checchio condemned the abuse of inmates at the Edna Mahan Correctional Facility for Women in Clinton, New Jersey, by some correctional officers.

=== Archbishop of New Orleans ===
On September 24, 2025, Checchio was appointed Coadjutor Archbishop of the Archdiocese of New Orleans by Pope Leo XIV.

On February 11, 2026, the Pope accepted the resignation of Gregory Michael Aymond, and Checchio became the next archbishop.

== See also ==
- Catholic Church hierarchy
- Catholic Church in the United States
- Historical list of the Catholic bishops of the United States
- List of Catholic bishops of the United States
- Lists of patriarchs, archbishops, and bishops

Preceded by Kevin McCoy	Rector of the North American College, Rome	Succeeded by Peter C. Harman
Preceded by Paul Bootkoski	Bishop of Metuchen; 2016–2025	Succeeded by Michael A. Saporito
Preceded by Gregory Aymond	Archbishop of New Orleans; 2026–present	incumbent
