= Vincent DePaul Breen =

American prelate

His Excellency, The Most Reverend Vincent DePaul Breen
- Bishop of Metuchen
- Diocese: Metuchen
- Appointed: July 8, 1997
- Installed: September 8, 1997
- Term ended: January 4, 2002
- Predecessor: Edward Thomas Hughes
- Successor: Paul Gregory Bootkoski

Orders
- Ordination: July 15, 1962 by Filippo Pocci
- Consecration: September 8, 1997 by Theodore McCarrick

Personal details
- Born: December 24, 1936 Brooklyn, New York, US
- Died: March 30, 2003 (aged 66) Metuchen, New Jersey, US
- Education: Cathedral College; Pontifical Gregorian University
- Motto: Fides spes caritas tria haec (Faith, hope charity; these three)

Vincent DePaul Breen (December 24, 1936 – March 30, 2003) was an American prelate of the Roman Catholic Church who served as the third bishop of the Diocese of Metuchen in central New Jersey from 1997 until his resignation in 2002.

== Early life ==
Breen was born on December 24, 1936, in Brooklyn, New York, to Edward and Irene (née Conway) Breen. Deciding to become a priest, he attended the St. Francis Preparatory School in Queens, New York. He continued his studies at Cathedral College in Queens. After two years of studies he was sent to Rome where he attended the Pontifical Gregorian University while residing at the Pontifical North American College.

== Priesthood ==
On July 15, 1962, Breen was ordained a priest for the Diocese of Brooklyn by Bishop Filippo Pocci at the Church of Basilica of Santi Apostoli in Rome. A year later, he graduated from the Gregorian University with a Licentiate in Sacred Theology.

After returning to Brooklyn, Breen served in pastoral roles in parishes for a short period. He was later appointed as assistant superintendent of education for the diocese. The Vatican elevated Breen to the rank of honorary prelate in 1977. In 1978 he was appointed as superintendent of education for the diocese. He was subsequently named vicar for education.

== Bishop of Metuchen ==
On July 8, 1997, Pope John Paul II appointed Breen as bishop of Metuchen. He was consecrated by Archbishop Theodore McCarrick at St. Francis of Assisi Cathedral in Metuchen on September 8,1997.

Breen died in Metuchen, New Jersey, of pneumonia on March 30, 2003, aged 66, following a long illness consistent with Alzheimer's disease.

Catholic Church titles
Preceded by Edward Thomas Hughes	Bishop of Metuchen; 1997-2002	Succeeded by Paul Gregory Bootkoski
