= Pocofeltus =

Roman–Berber town in present-day Tunisia

Africa Proconsularis (125 AD)

Pocofeltus was a Roman–Berber civitas (town) in the province of Africa Proconsularis, located in present-day Tunisia. It was also the seat of an ancient Roman Catholic diocese.

The only known ancient bishop of this diocese was the Catholic bishop Surgentius, who attended the Council of Carthage (314). The bishopric is presumed to have been active throughout the Roman era, Vandal Kingdom and Byzantine Empire, but ceasing to function effectively with the Muslim conquest of the Maghreb. Charles James McDonnell was titular bishop from 1994 until his death in 2020.
