= Charles James McDonnell =

American Catholic bishop (1928–2020)

His Excellency, The Most Reverend Charles James McDonnell
- Auxiliary Bishop Emeritus of Newark; Titular Bishop of Pocofeltus
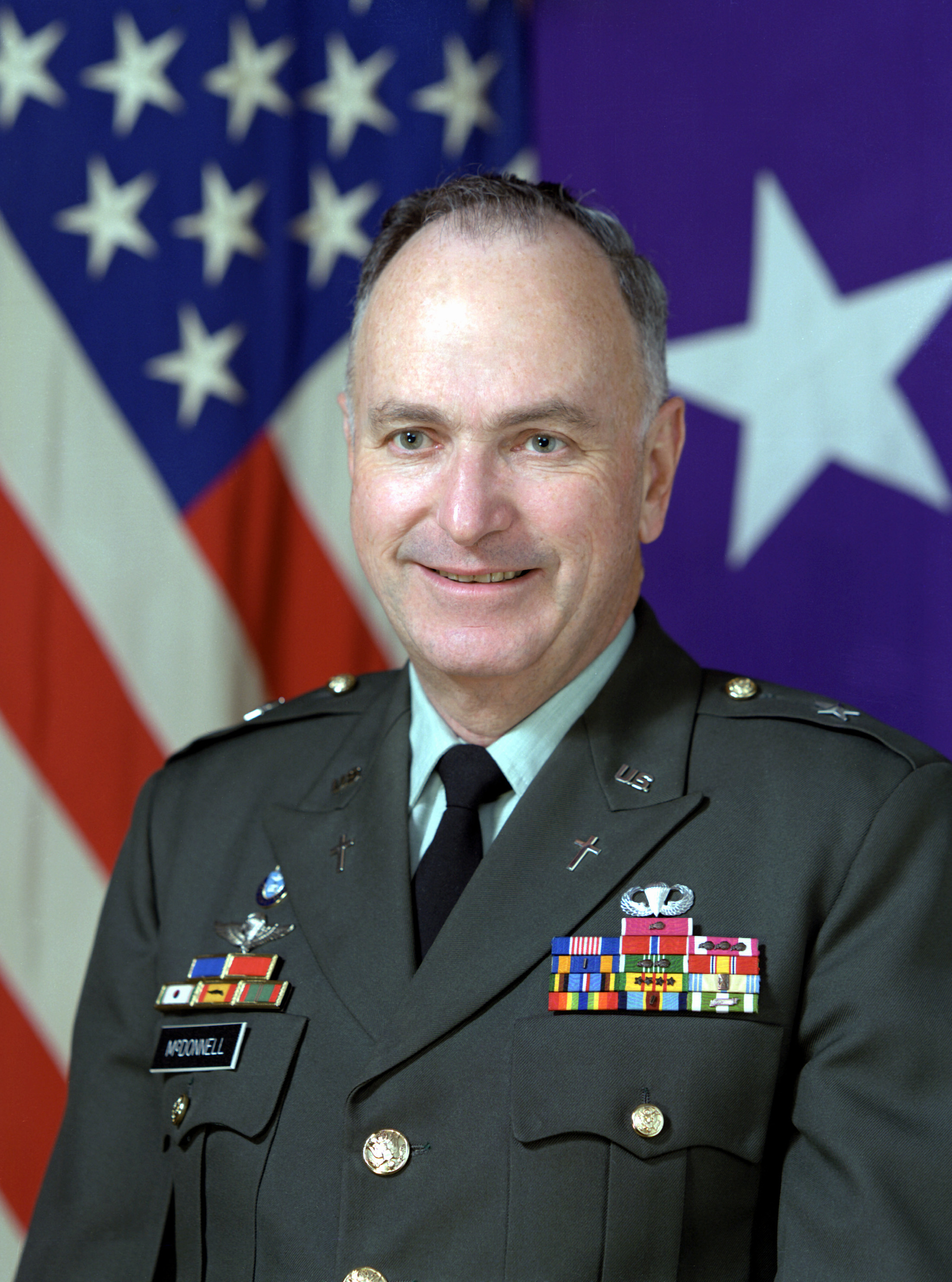
- Charles McDonnell, Deputy Chief of Chaplains of the U.S. Army, 1986-1989
- Archdiocese: Newark
- Appointed: March 15, 1994
- Installed: May 12, 1994
- Term ended: May 21, 2004
- Other post: Titular Bishop of Pocofeltus

Orders
- Ordination: May 29, 1954
- Consecration: May 21, 1994 by Theodore Edgar McCarrick, Peter Leo Gerety, and Michael Angelo Saltarelli

Personal details
- Born: July 7, 1928 Queens, New York
- Died: February 13, 2020 (aged 91) Newark, New Jersey
- Denomination: Roman Catholic

Styles of Charles James McDonnell
- Reference style: His Excellency; The Most Reverend
- Spoken style: Your Excellency
- Religious style: Bishop

Charles James McDonnell (July 7, 1928 – February 13, 2020) was an American Roman Catholic titular bishop of Pocofeltus and auxiliary bishop of the Roman Catholic Archdiocese of Newark, New Jersey.

== Biography ==
Born in Queens, New York, McDonnell was ordained for the Newark Archdiocese on May 29, 1954.

On March 15, 1994, he was named bishop and was consecrated as bishop on May 21, 1994. Bishop McDonnell retired on May 21, 2004. He died on February 13, 2020, aged 91.

== Awards and decorations ==
Among his awards and decorations are:

- Legion of Merit (with one bronze oak leaf cluster)
- Soldier's Medal
- Bronze Star
- Meritorious Service Medal (with three bronze oak leaf clusters)
- Air Medal
- Army Commendation Medal (with two bronze oak leaf clusters)
- Presidential Unit Citation
- Army Meritorious Unit Commendation
- Republic of Korea Presidential Unit Citation
- Vietnam Gallantry Cross Unit Citation
- Vietnam Civil Actions Unit Citation
- National Defense Service Medal
- Armed Forces Expeditionary Medal
- Vietnam Service Medal (with four bronze service stars)
- Armed Forces Reserve Medal
- Army Service Ribbon
- Overseas Service Ribbon (with award numeral 2)
- Vietnam Campaign Medal

== See also ==
- Catholic Church hierarchy
- Catholic Church in the United States
- Historical list of the Catholic bishops of the United States
- List of Catholic bishops of the United States
- Lists of patriarchs, archbishops, and bishops

== Episcopal succession ==
Catholic Church titles
Preceded by –	Auxiliary Bishop of Newark; 1994–2004	Succeeded by –
