= Edward Hughes (bishop) =

American prelate

His Excellency, The Most Reverend Edward Hughes D.D.
- Bishop of Metuchen
- Diocese: Metuchen
- Appointed: December 11, 1986
- Installed: February 5, 1987
- Term ended: July 8, 1997
- Predecessor: Theodore Edgar McCarrick
- Successor: Vincent DePaul Breen
- Previous posts: Auxiliary Bishop of Philadelphia (1976-1986); Titular Bishop of Segia (1976–1986)

Orders
- Ordination: May 31, 1947 by Hugh L. Lamb
- Consecration: June 14, 1976 by John Krol

Personal details
- Born: November 13, 1920 Lansdowne, Pennsylvania
- Died: December 25, 2012 (aged 92)
- Education: St. Charles Borromeo Seminary; University of Pennsylvania
- Motto: Rejoice in the Lord always

Edward Thomas Hughes (November 13, 1920 – December 25, 2012) was an American prelate of the Catholic Church who served as bishop of Metuchen in New Jersey from 1987 to 1997. He previously served as an auxiliary bishop of the Archdiocese of Philadelphia in Pennsylvania from 1976 to 1987.

== Biography ==
=== Early life ===
Hughes was born on November 13, 1920, in Lansdowne, Pennsylvania, to Charles and Kathryn (née Mingey) Hughes. He was the grandson of Irish immigrants. He attended West Philadelphia Catholic High School, and studied for the priesthood at St. Charles Borromeo Seminary in Philadelphia.

=== Priesthood ===
Hughes was ordained a priest by Bishop Hugh Louis Lamb for the Archdiocese of Philadelphia on May 31, 1947. After his ordination, the diocese assigned Hughes to the faculty at St. James High School in Chester, Pennsylvania. In 1961, he was name superintendent of Catholics schools. He left that job in 1970 to serve as pastor of Our Lady of Fatima Parish in Secane, Pennsylvania.

=== Auxiliary Bishop of Philadelphia ===
On June 14, 1976, Hughes was appointed auxiliary bishop of Philadelphia and titular bishop of Segia by Pope Paul VI. He received his episcopal consecration at the Cathedral of Saints Peter and Paul in Philadelphia on July 21, 1978, from Cardinal John Krol, with Bishops Gerald Vincent McDevitt and John Joseph Graham serving as co-consecrators. As an auxiliary bishop, he continued to serve at Our Lady of Fatima.

=== Bishop of Metuchen ===
Hughes was appointed the second bishop of Metuchen in New Jersey on December 11, 1986, and was installed on February 5, 1987.

=== Retirement and death ===
Hughes resigned as bishop of Metuchen on July 7, 1997. Hughes continued to perform confirmations and celebrate masses in the diocese for many years after his retirement. He died on December 25, 2012, at the age of 92.

In November 2020, a Vatican investigation into the case of defrocked former cardinal Theodore McCarrick identified Hughes as one of three bishops who "provided inaccurate and incomplete information to the Holy See regarding McCarrick's sexual conduct with young adults". This occurred when McCarrick was a candidate for archbishop of Washington in 2000. Hughes did conclude was that it would be "unwise to consider the Archbishop for any promotion or additional honor".

Catholic Church titles
Preceded by –	Bishop Emeritus of Metuchen; 1995–2012	Succeeded by –
Preceded by Theodore Edgar McCarrick	Bishop of Metuchen; 1987-1995	Succeeded by Vincent DePaul Breen
Preceded by –	Auxiliary Bishop of Philadelphia; 1976–1987	Succeeded by –
