= St. James Catholic Church (Woodbridge, New Jersey) =

- St. James Catholic Church
- 40.552882°N 74.281815°W
- Location: Woodbridge, New Jersey
- Country: United States
- Denomination: Roman Catholic
- Website: https://www.stjamesonline.org/

History
- Founded: 1860

Architecture
- Completed: 1865

Administration
- Diocese: Metuchen

St. James Catholic Church is located in Woodbridge, New Jersey. With approximately 4,000 registered families, St. James is one of the largest parishes in the Roman Catholic Diocese of Metuchen.

== History ==
St. James was founded in the village of Woodbridge in 1860, however Mass was celebrated in households. In 1865, the a small wooden chapel was built on the south side of Main Street. St. James soon became a mission of St. Mary's in Perth Amboy. In 1877, Woodbridge received its first resident pastor, Fr. Stephen Berteloni, who served until his death four years later.

Fr. James F. Devine was appointed the new pastor of St. James. Fr. Devine laid the cornerstone of a new wooden church in 1887. The church was consecrated in 1888, and on this occasion, the church was officially dedicated to St. James the Less. Fr. Devine also invited the Sisters of Mercy from Bordentown, New Jersey to start St. James School, which was to be housed in the old converted chapel.

In 1918, Fr. Richard Farrell was appointed pastor. Fr Farrell made many changes to St. James, the largest of which was the moving of the church building by tractor to Amboy Avenue.

Fr. Charles McCorristin was appointed pastor in 1937, and Monsignor in 1948. Due to the continuous growth of the parish, Msgr McCorristin oversaw an addition to the school as well as a campaign to build a new church.

After the death of Msgr McCorristin in 1966, Msgr. Maurice Griffin held a groundbreaking ceremony for the new church. The old church was demolished April 1968 and the new church was dedicated June 23, 1968. The new St. James was built of Pennsylvania limestone, in the Neo-Romanesque style. The church can seat 1,200 people, nearly twice that of the second parish church. The imposing edifice is at the corner of Main Street and Amboy Avenue (Route 25) and is the most imposing structure in downtown Woodbridge.

Throughout the late 1980s and early 1990s the New Parish Building underwent many changes. The simple sanctuary was repainted and new fixtures introduced.

In 1995, St. James welcomed a community of Vietnamese immigrants into the parish. This community was active in the parish and ministers to about 400 families. The Vietnamese community was asked to move to a smaller church, Our Lady of Czestochowa Church in South Plainfield, NJ.

The Parish community celebrated its 150th anniversary in 2010 and will celebrate its 165th in 2025.

Along with the Church, the parish operates an elementary school, food pantry and a cemetery.

== Sources ==
- Michael Krull, The Roman Catholic Diocese of Metuchen, Editions de Signe, Strasbourg, France, 2005
- St. James Church, Custombook, Inc., 1970
