= Michael A. Saporito =

American Catholic prelate (born 1962)

His Excellency, The Most Reverend Michael A. Saporito
- Bishop of Metuchen
- Diocese: Metuchen
- Appointed: September 15, 2026
- Installed: October 22, 2026
- Predecessor: James F. Checchio
- Previous post: Auxiliary Bishop of Newark and Titular Bishop of Luperciana (2020-2026)

Orders
- Ordination: May 30, 1992 by Theodore McCarrick
- Consecration: June 30, 2020 by Joseph W. Tobin, Manuel Aurelio Cruz, and John Walter Flesey

Personal details
- Born: May 3, 1962 (age 64) Newark, New Jersey, US
- Education: Rutgers University–Newark; Immaculate Conception Seminary
- Motto: Feed my sheep
- Styles
- Reference style: His Excellency; The Most Reverend
- Spoken style: Your Excellency
- Religious style: Bishop

Michael Arsenio Saporito (born May 3, 1962) is an American Catholic prelate serving as Bishop of Metuchen since 2026. He previously served as an auxiliary bishop for the Archdiocese of Newark in New Jersey from 2020 to 2026.

== Biography ==
=== Early life ===
Saporito was born on May 3, 1962, in Newark, New Jersey, to Arsenio and Anna Saporito, and was raised in nearby Bloomfield. He was educated at St. Thomas the Apostle Elementary School in Bloomfield, New Jersey, then attended Paul VI Regional High School in Clifton, New Jersey, graduating in 1980. Saporito attended Rutgers University–Newark, where he received a Bachelor of Arts degree in accounting in 1984.

Before he decided to enter the priesthood, Saporito worked in public accounting. In 1987, he entered Immaculate Conception Seminary at Seton Hall University in South Orange, New Jersey.

=== Priesthood ===
On May 30, 1992, Saporito was ordained to the priesthood for the Archdiocese of Newark by Archbishop Theodore McCarrick at the Cathedral Basilica of the Sacred Heart in Newark, New Jersey.

After his 1992 ordination, the diocese assigned Saporito as parochial vicar at the following New Jersey parishes:

- St. Joseph in West Orange (1992 to 1994)
- St. Peter the Apostle in River Edge (1994 to 1999)
- Our Lady of the Visitation in Paramus (1999 to 2001)
- St. Elizabeth in Wyckoff (2001 to 2004)

In 2004, Saporito was selected as pastor of St. Joseph’s parish in Maplewood, New Jersey. He left St. Joseph's in 2011 to become pastor of St. Helen’s Parish in Westfield, New Jersey.

== Episcopal career ==
=== Auxiliary Bishop of Newark ===
Coat of Arms as Auxiliary Bishop of Newark

Pope Francis appointed Saporito as an auxiliary bishop of Newark on February 27, 2020. Saporito's consecration as a bishop, originally scheduled for May 5, 2020, but postponed due to the COVID-19 pandemic, occurred on June 30, 2020 at the Cathedral Basilica of the Sacred Heart in Newark. He was consecrated by Cardinal Joseph W. Tobin, with Auxiliary Bishops Manuel Cruz and John Flesey serving as co-consecrators.

=== Bishop of Metuchen ===
On September 15, 2026, Pope Leo XIV named Saporito the sixth bishop of the Diocese of Metuchen, succeeding James F. Checchio.

== See also ==
- Catholic Church hierarchy
- Catholic Church in the United States
- Historical list of the Catholic bishops of the United States
- List of Catholic bishops of the United States
- Lists of patriarchs, archbishops, and bishops

== Episcopal succession ==
Catholic Church titles
Preceded by James F. Checchio	Bishop of Metuchen; 2026–present	Succeeded by Incumbent
Preceded by -	Auxiliary Bishop of Newark; 2020–2026	Succeeded by -
