= Saint Mary of Mount Virgin Roman Catholic Church =

- U.S. National Register of Historic Places
- New Jersey Register of Historic Places
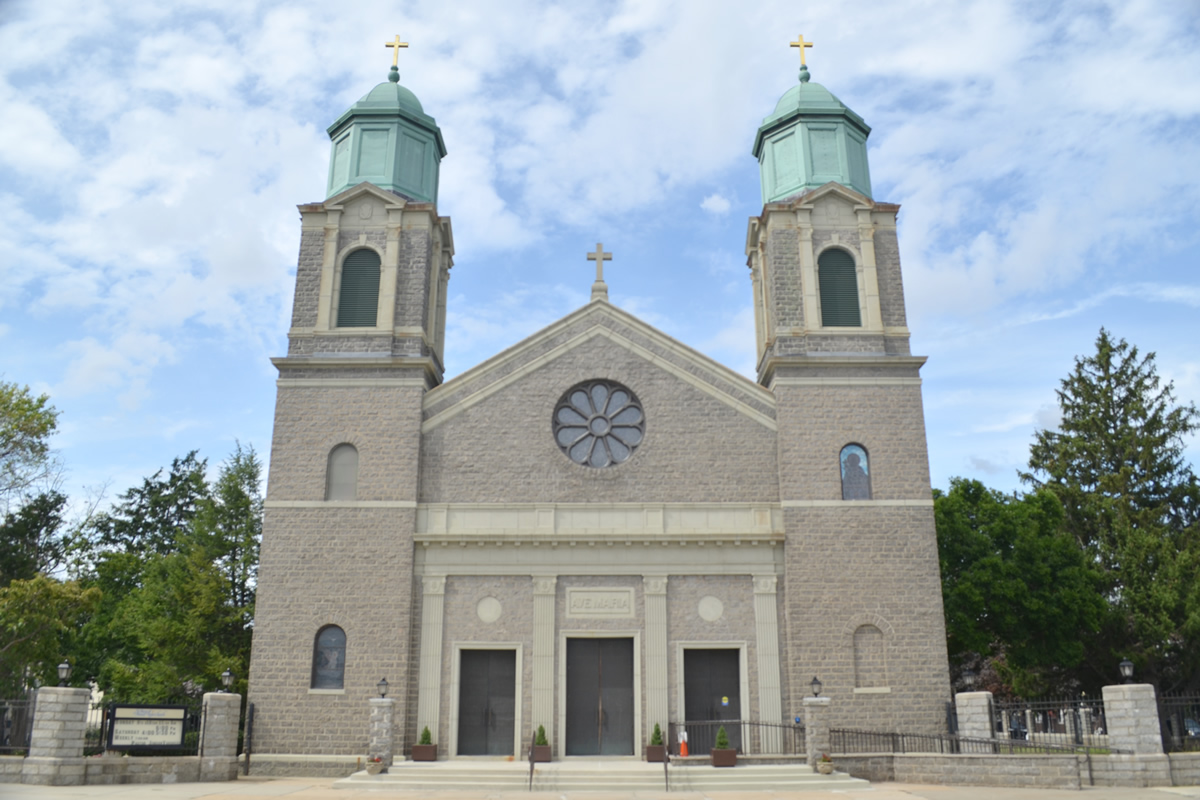

- Location within Middlesex County, New Jersey Location within New Jersey Location within the United States
- Location: 190 Sandford Street; New Brunswick, New Jersey
- Coordinates: 40°29′2″N 74°26′59″W
- Built: 1928–1929
- Architect: Clyde Smythe Adams
- Architectural style: Romanesque Revival
- NRHP reference No.: 10000877
- NJRHP No.: 5017

Significant dates
- Added to NRHP: November 3, 2010
- Designated NJRHP: June 8, 2010

The Saint Mary of Mount Virgin Roman Catholic Church is a historic church building located at 190 Sandford Street in the city of New Brunswick in Middlesex County, New Jersey. It was constructed during the tenure of Rev. Pasquale Mugnano (1888–1971), from Naples, who was pastor of the parish from 1923 to 1970. The building was added to the National Register of Historic Places on November 3, 2010, for its significance in art and architecture from 1928 to 1959.

== History and description ==
The church was designed by Philadelphia architect Clyde Smythe Adams, Sr., in the Romanesque Revival style for the Italian-American community in New Brunswick. It was constructed from 1928 to 1929 by the John P. Hallahan construction company. Built using granite blocks with lighter stone trim, it features twin bell towers 90 feet (27 m) high. In the 1930s, ecclesiastical artist, Gonippo G. Raggi, decorated the interior extensively, including large murals. The church also features 28 stained glass windows.

== See also ==
- National Register of Historic Places listings in Middlesex County, New Jersey
- List of churches in the Roman Catholic Diocese of Metuchen
