= Vincent I. Breen =

Vincent Ignatius Breen (January 12, 1911 – December 31, 1986) was a Roman Catholic priest of the United States dioceses of San Francisco and Oakland, California.

Born in San Francisco (Potrero Hill) in 1910 to an Irish steamfitter, Breen received ordination from St. Patrick's Seminary in Menlo Park in 1936, serving as parish priest for Stockton, California, from 1936 to 1937. From 1938 to 1941, Breen attended Catholic University in Washington, D.C., receiving a PhD in Labor Relations in 1942. He served as the Assistant Superintendent of San Francisco Archdiocese Catholic Schools 1942 until 1943 or 1944, and was the founding Principal of Junípero Serra High School, serving in that position from 1944 until 1952. Breen served as Pastor for Holy Ghost (later, Holy Spirit) Parish in Fremont, California, from 1953 until 1982.

Breen was repeatedly accused of sexual misconduct.
