= Paul Gregory Bootkoski =

American Catholic prelate (born 1940)

His Excellency, The Most Reverend Paul Gregory Bootkoski
- Bishop Emeritus of Metuchen
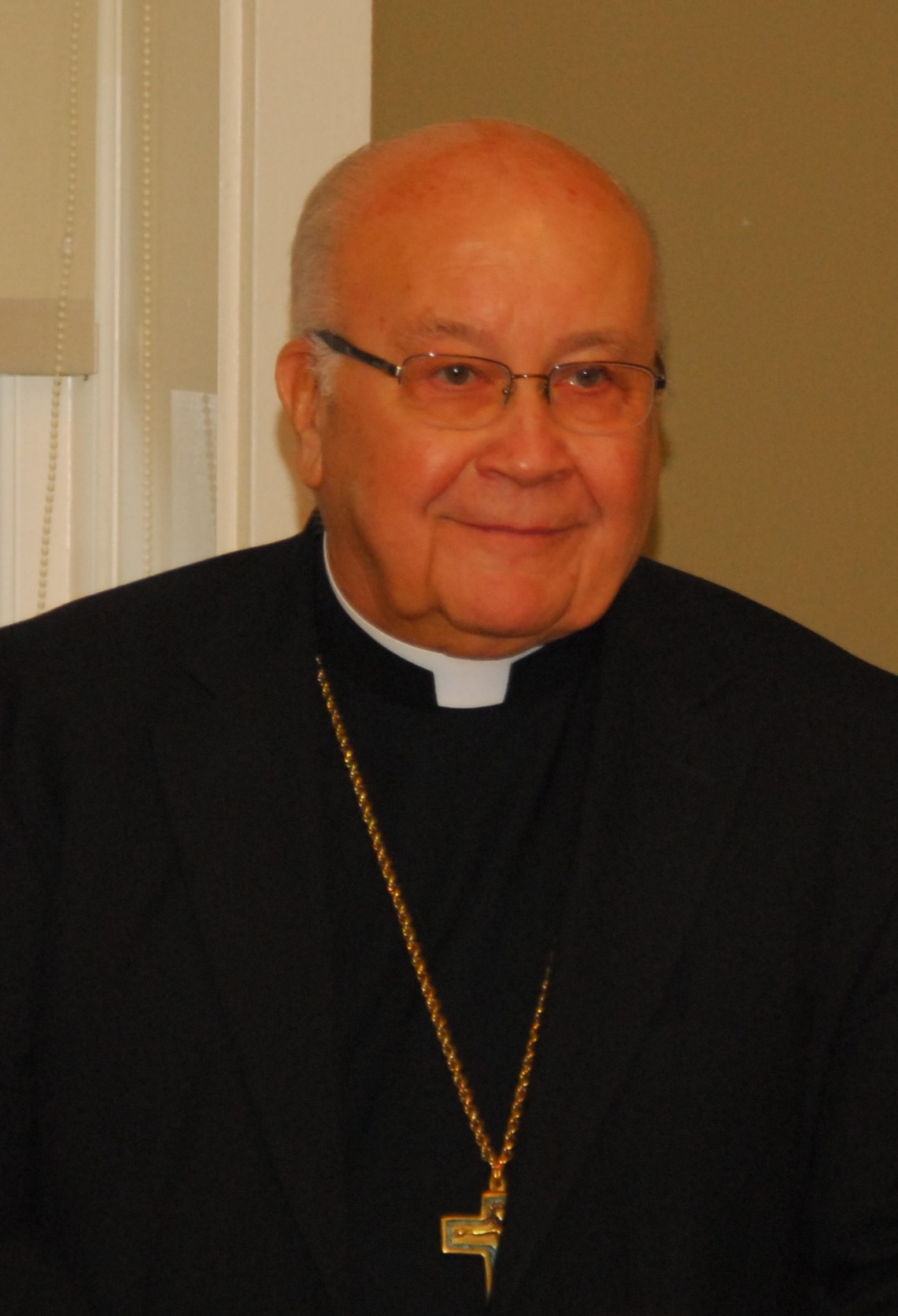
- Bootkoski in December 2014
- Church: Catholic Church; Latin Church
- Diocese: Metuchen
- Appointed: January 4, 2002
- Installed: March 19, 2002
- Retired: March 8, 2016
- Predecessor: Vincent DePaul Breen
- Successor: James Checchio
- Previous posts: Auxiliary Bishop of Newark and Titular Bishop of Zarna (1997‍–‍2002)

Orders
- Ordination: May 28, 1966
- Consecration: September 5, 1997 by Theodore Edgar McCarrick, John Smith, and Michael Angelo Saltarelli

Personal details
- Born: July 4, 1940 (age 86) Newark, New Jersey, US
- Motto: God’s grace suffices

Styles of Paul Gregory Bootkoski
- Reference style: His Excellency; The Most Reverend
- Spoken style: Your Excellency
- Religious style: Bishop

Paul Gregory Bootkoski (born July 4, 1940) is an American prelate of the Catholic Church. Bootkoski served as bishop of the Latin Church Diocese of Metuchen in New Jersey from 2002 until March 8, 2016; he was replaced by Monsignor James Checchio. Bootkoski previously served as an auxiliary bishop of the Archdiocese of Newark in New Jersey from 1997 to 2002.

== Biography ==
=== Early years ===
Paul Bootkoski was born in Newark, New Jersey on July 4, 1940, to Peter and Antoinette Bootkoski. He attended Our Lady Queen of Peace School in North Arlington, New Jersey, before continuing at St. Benedict's Preparatory School in Newark, New Jersey. After graduating from Seton Hall University in South Orange, New Jersey, with a degree in classical languages, Bootkoski entered Immaculate Conception Seminary at the university. He also received a Master of Education degree from Manhattan College in New York City.

=== Priesthood ===
On May 28, 1966, Bootkoski was ordained as a priest for the Archdiocese of Newark by Archbishop Thomas Boland. In 1980, Bootkoski was appointed assistant vice president for student affairs at Seton Hall. In 1983, He became pastor of St. Mary of the Assumption Parish in Elizabeth, New Jersey and was named by the Vatican as an honorary prelate with the title of monsignor in 1991.

=== Auxiliary Bishop of Newark ===
On July 8, 1997, Pope John Paul II appointed Bootkoski as an auxiliary bishop of Newark. He was consecrated by then Archbishop Theodore E. McCarrick on September 5, 1997, at the Cathedral Basilica of the Sacred Heart in Newark.

Bootkoski became vicar general of the diocese and on January 5, 2001, diocesan administrator when McCarrick was appointed archbishop of the Archdiocese of Washington.

=== Bishop of Metuchen ===
On January 4, 2002, John Paul II appointed Bootkoski as the fourth bishop of Metuchen. He was installed on March 19, 2002.

On January 31, 2003, Bootkoski approved an $800,000 settlement to ten people who had alleged sexual abuse when they were minors by five diocesan priests. In 2005 and 2007, the Diocese of Metuchen and the Archdiocese of Newark paid financial settlements to two priests who had accused McCarrick of abuse. According to Cardinal Donald Wuerl, nobody from the Diocese of Metuchen informed him of these settlements, even after the retired McCarrick began living on the grounds of a seminary in the Archdiocese of Washington.

== Retirement ==
Having passed the normal retirement age of 75, Bootkoski's resignation as bishop of the Diocese of Metuchen was accepted by Pope Francis on March 8, 2016.

In 2018, Archbishop Carlo Viganò accused Bootkoski of assisting in a coverup of sexual abuse acts by McCarrick. In reply, Bootkoski said that Viganò's memory was faulty and that Bootkoski had reported the allegations of abuse from three priests against McCarrick to the Vatican in 2005. On November 10, 2020, the Vatican published the McCarrick Report, an investigation into the McCarrick case. The report verified that Bootkoski reported McCarrick in 2005.

== See also ==
- Hierarchy of the Catholic Church
- Catholic Church in the United States
- Historical list of the Catholic bishops of the United States
- List of Catholic bishops in the United States
- Lists of popes, patriarchs, primates, archbishops, and bishops

== Episcopal succession ==
Catholic Church titles
Preceded by Vincent DePaul Breen	Bishop of Metuchen; 2002–2016	Succeeded by James Checchio
Preceded by –	Auxiliary Bishop of Newark; 1997–2002	Succeeded by –
