= Theodore McCarrick =

American Catholic prelate (1930–2025)

- Archbishop Emeritus of Washington
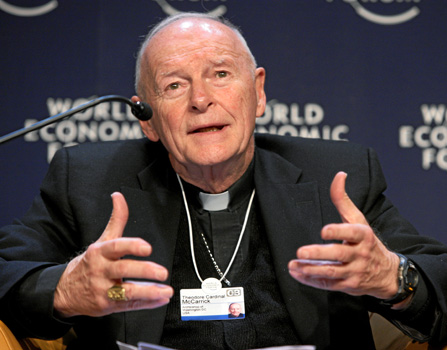
- McCarrick in 2008
- Archdiocese: Washington
- Appointed: November 21, 2000
- Installed: January 3, 2001
- Term ended: May 16, 2006
- Predecessor: James Aloysius Hickey
- Successor: Donald Wuerl
- Other post: Cardinal Priest of Santi Nereo e Achilleo (2001‍–‍2018)
- Previous posts: President Pontifical Catholic University of Puerto Rico (1966‍–‍1969); Titular Bishop of Rusibisir (1977‍–‍1981); Auxiliary Bishop of New York (1977‍–‍1981); Bishop of Metuchen (1981‍–‍1986); Archbishop of Newark (1986‍–‍2000); Ecclesiastical Superior of the Turks and Caicos Islands (1998‍–‍2000)

Orders
- Ordination: May 31, 1958 by Francis Spellman
- Consecration: June 29, 1977 by Terence Cooke
- Created cardinal: February 21, 2001 by Pope John Paul II; Resigned July 28, 2018
- Laicized: February 13, 2019 by Pope Francis

Personal details
- Born: July 7, 1930 New York City, U.S.
- Died: April 3, 2025 (aged 94) Dittmer, Missouri, U.S.
- Motto: Come Lord Jesus
- Coat of arms: Theodore McCarrick's coat of arms

Ordination history
History
Priestly ordination
- Ordained by: Francis Spellman
- Date: May 31, 1958
Episcopal consecration
- Consecrated by: Terence Cooke
- Date: June 29, 1977
Cardinalate
- Elevated by: Pope John Paul II
- Date: February 21, 2001
Episcopal succession
Bishops consecrated by Theodore McCarrick as principal consecrator
- John Mortimer Smith: January 25, 1988
- James Thomas McHugh: January 25, 1988
- Michael Angelo Saltarelli: July 30, 1990
- Charles James McDonnell: March 12, 1994
- João José Burke: May 25, 1995
- Nicholas Anthony DiMarzio: October 31, 1996
- Paul Gregory Bootkoski: September 5, 1997
- Vincent DePaul Breen: September 8, 1997
- Arthur Joseph Serratelli: September 8, 2000
- Francisco González Valer: February 11, 2002
- Kevin Joseph Farrell: February 11, 2002
- Martin Holley: July 2, 2004

Theodore Edgar McCarrick (July 7, 1930 – April 3, 2025) was an American former Catholic prelate who was dismissed and laicized by Pope Francis in 2019 after being convicted of sexual misconduct in a canonical trial. Prior to his dismissal, he served as a bishop and cardinal, holding the positions of Archbishop of Newark from 1986 to 2000 and Archbishop of Washington from 2001 to 2006.

Ordained a priest in 1958, McCarrick became an auxiliary bishop of the Archdiocese of New York in 1977. He then became Bishop of Metuchen in 1981. From 1986 to 2000, he served as Archbishop of Newark. He was appointed Archbishop of Washington in 2000 and made a cardinal in 2001. A prolific fundraiser, he was connected to prominent politicians and was considered a power broker in Washington, D.C. Within the church, McCarrick was generally regarded as a champion of progressive Catholics.

McCarrick was initially accused of engaging in sexual misconduct with adult male seminarians. Multiple reports about his alleged misconduct were made to American bishops and the Holy See, but McCarrick vehemently denied the allegations to the Vatican. After a credible allegation of repeated sexual misconduct towards boys and seminarians was lodged with the Archdiocese of New York, McCarrick was removed from public ministry in 2018. The following month, The New York Times published a story detailing a pattern of sexual abuse of male seminarians and minors by McCarrick, leading him to resign from the College of Cardinals. After a church investigation and trial, McCarrick was found guilty of sexual crimes against adults and minors and abuse of power and was dismissed from the clerical state in 2019. He was the most senior church official in modern times to be laicized, and his was the first known case of a cardinal resigning from the College of Cardinals and being laicized for sexual abuse.

McCarrick's case sparked demands for accountability and reform in the Catholic Church. Pope Francis ordered "a thorough study" of the Vatican's records on McCarrick "to ascertain all the relevant facts, to place them in their historical context and to evaluate them objectively". The study was published by the Secretariat of State in 2020.

== Early life and education ==
An only child, McCarrick was born on July 7, 1930 to Theodore E. and Margaret T. (née McLaughlin) McCarrick in New York City. His family was Irish-American. His father was a ship captain who died from tuberculosis when McCarrick was three years old, and his mother then worked at an automobile parts factory in The Bronx. As a child, McCarrick served as an altar boy at the Church of the Incarnation in Washington Heights.

McCarrick was expelled from the Jesuit Xavier High School in his junior year for missing classes. McCarrick missed an academic year due to the expulsion, but a family friend was able to help get him into the Jesuit Fordham Preparatory School. At Fordham, he was elected student council president and served in the ROTC program for the United States Air Force. McCarrick studied in Switzerland for a year before returning to the United States and attending Fordham University.

McCarrick later entered St. Joseph's Seminary in Yonkers, where he obtained a Bachelor of Arts in philosophy (1954) and a Master of Arts in theology (1958). McCarrick was a polyglot, speaking five languages (English, French, German, Italian, and Spanish).

== Priesthood ==
McCarrick was ordained to the priesthood by Cardinal Francis Spellman, Archbishop of New York, on May 31, 1958. From 1958 to 1963, he furthered his studies at the Catholic University of America in Washington, D.C., earning a PhD in sociology. He then served as an assistant chaplain at the Catholic University, becoming dean of students and director of development.

McCarrick served as president of the Catholic University of Puerto Rico from 1965 to 1969, and was given the honorary title of Domestic Prelate of His Holiness in 1965. While president, he was one of the authors of the Land O'Lakes Statement in 1967. In 1969, Cardinal Terence Cooke recalled McCarrick to New York. McCarrick was an associate secretary for education and an assistant priest at Blessed Sacrament parish from 1969 to 1971. He was Cooke's secretary from 1971 to 1977. He was later accused of sexually abusing a male minor during this period.

== Episcopal career ==
=== Auxiliary bishop of New York ===
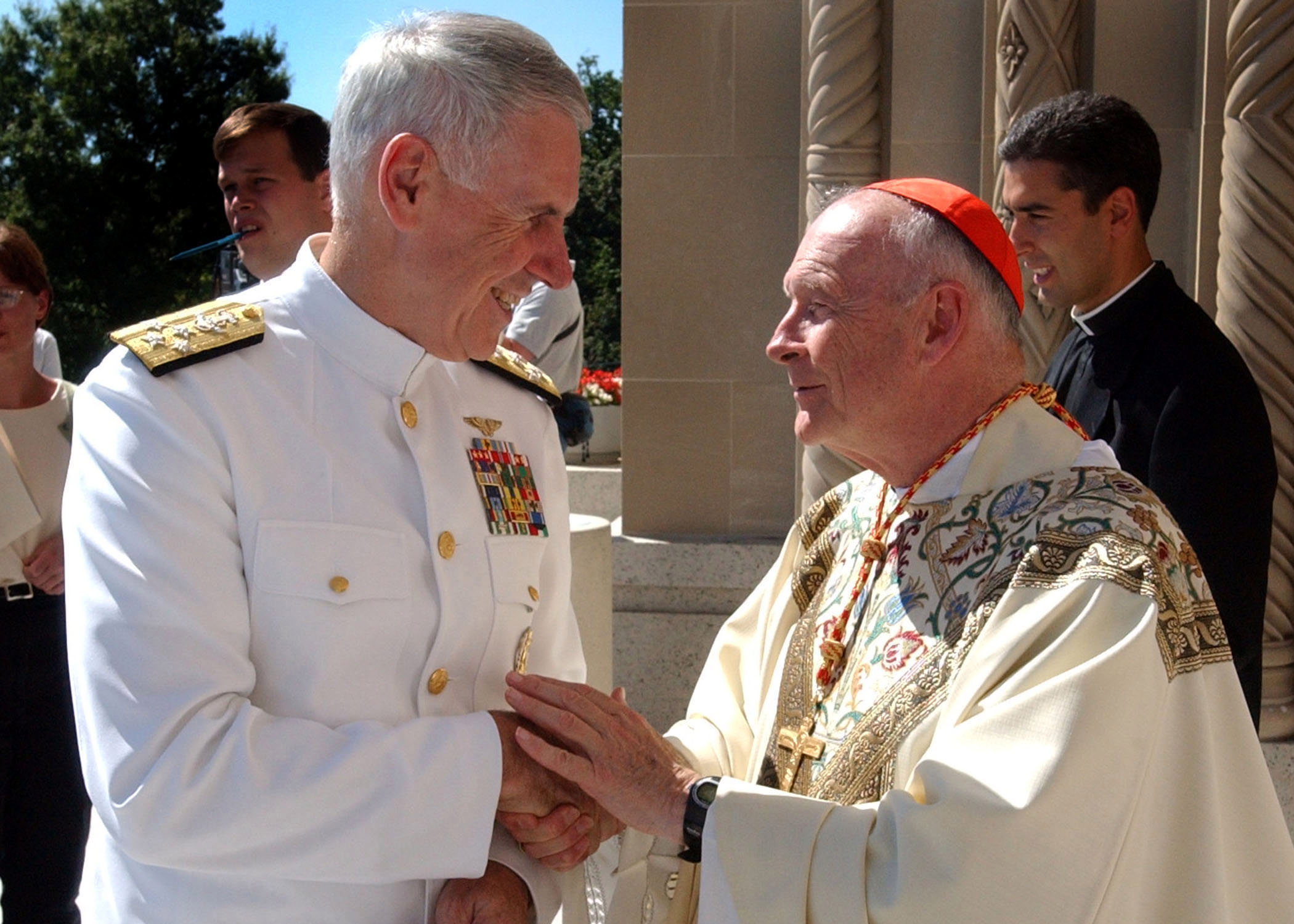
McCarrick and Admiral William Fallon, September 16, 2001, in Washington, D.C.

In May 1977, McCarrick was appointed Auxiliary Bishop of New York and Titular Bishop of Rusibisir by Pope Paul VI. He received his episcopal consecration on the following June 29 from Cardinal Cooke, with Archbishop John Maguire and Bishop Patrick Ahern serving as co-consecrators. He selected as his episcopal motto "Come Lord Jesus". As an auxiliary to Cardinal Cooke, he served as vicar of East Manhattan and the Harlems.

=== Bishop of Metuchen ===
On November 19, 1981, McCarrick was appointed the first bishop of the Diocese of Metuchen, New Jersey. He was installed at St. Francis of Assisi Cathedral on January 31, 1982. During his tenure, McCarrick erected new parishes in Perth Amboy, Califon, Skillman, Old Bridge, and Three Bridges. He was also on the Bishops' Ad Hoc Committee that revised the New American Bible in 1986 and oversaw the development of the Diocesan Council of Catholic Women, Bishop's Annual Appeal, and ministries for blacks and Hispanics, anti-abortion activities, and the disabled.

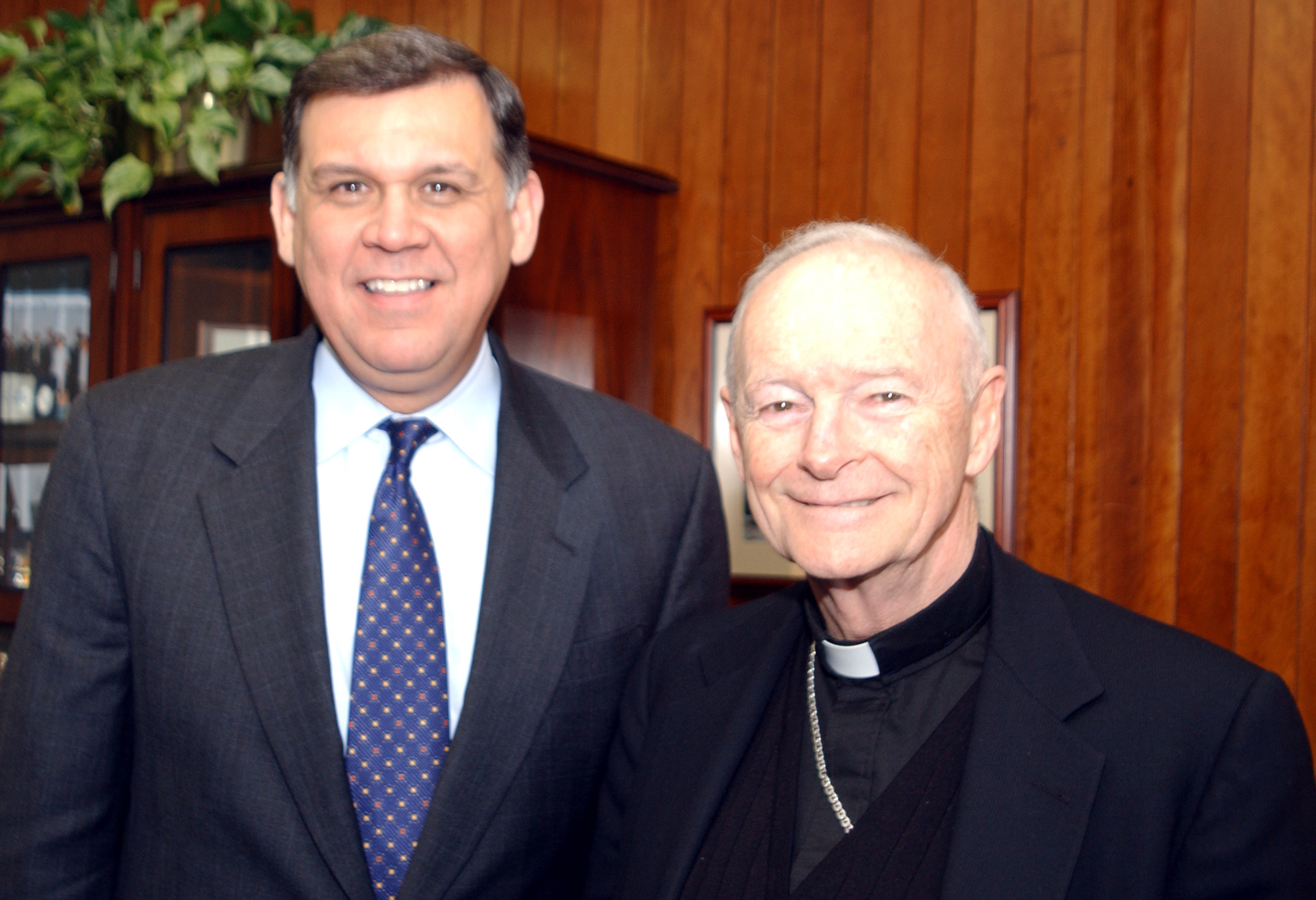
HUD Secretary Mel Martinez with Cardinal Theodore McCarrick in February 2002

In 2001 a Catholic high school, originally established in 1885 and renamed multiple times, was named Cardinal McCarrick High School in honor of McCarrick as the first bishop of the diocese. The school, which was located in South Amboy, closed in June 2015.

=== Archbishop of Newark ===
On May 30, 1986, McCarrick was appointed the fourth Archbishop of Newark. He succeeded Peter Leo Gerety, and was installed at the Cathedral of the Sacred Heart on the following July 25. During his tenure, he established the Office of Evangelization, ministries for Hispanics and victims of HIV, and a drug prevention program. He also promoted vocations, and ordained a total of 200 priests for the archdiocese.

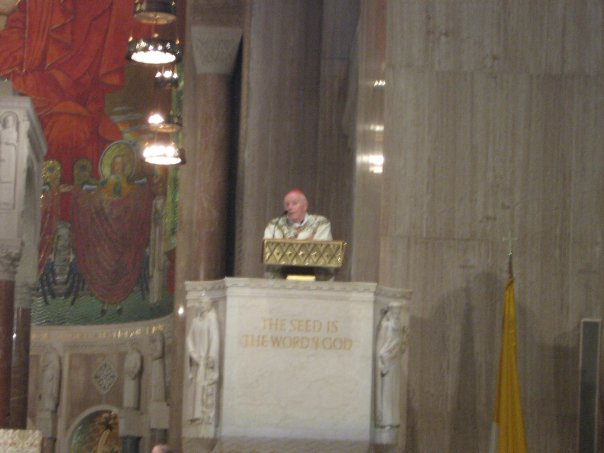
McCarrick in June 2006

McCarrick became known as an advocate for social justice, once saying, "[T]he Church cannot be authentic unless it takes care of the poor, the newcomers, the needy." During the 1980s, he served as an official observer to the Helsinki Commission and the Conference on Security and Co-operation in Europe at the behest of the U.S. State Department. In 1988, he participated in an interfaith meeting with Fidel Castro to promote religious freedom in Cuba, the first meeting of its kind subsequent to the fall of Fulgencio Batista. McCarrick, as a representative of Irish immigrant families, was chosen to be placed in the Ellis Island Hall of Fame on December 8, 1990.

Within the United States Conference of Catholic Bishops (USCCB), he served as chairman of the Committee on Aid to the Church in Central and Eastern Europe from 1992 to 1997. In this capacity, he visited such countries as Serbia and Montenegro, the Baltics, and Kazakhstan. He was twice elected to head the USCCB's Committee on Migration, and once asked the United States Congress "to recognize and support the important task of nurturing new citizens so that they may begin to play a full role in the future of this nation." He later became a member of the Pontifical Council for the Pastoral Care of Migrants and Itinerant Peoples.

He was elected chairman of the Bishops' Committee on International Policy in 1996. He visited Bosnia (which he described as "reminiscent of the Holocaust"), China, Poland, Romania, Russia, Rwanda, and Switzerland. Joined by Secretary of Labor Alexis Herman, he announced an initiative in 1997 to assure that Catholic school uniforms in his archdiocese would not be manufactured in sweatshops. In 1998, in addition to his duties as archbishop, McCarrick was designated as superior of the Catholic Mission sui iuris of the Turks and Caicos Islands; he delegated this mission to priests of the Neocatechumenal Way.

=== Archbishop of Washington ===
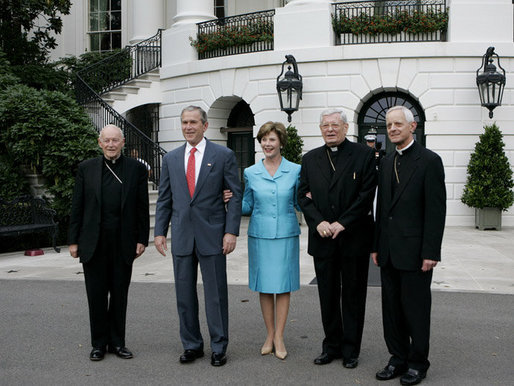
President George W. Bush and Laura Bush welcome outgoing Archbishop of Washington McCarrick, left, the incoming Archbishop of Washington Donald Wuerl, far right, and Papal Nuncio Pietro Sambi to the White House.

In 1999, Pope John Paul II informed Cardinal John O'Connor that he was considering appointing McCarrick the Archbishop of Washington, D.C.. O'Connor wrote to Gabriel Montalvo Higuera, the papal nuncio to the United States, informing him of reports of misconduct by McCarrick. Following an investigation, Montalvo advised against appointing McCarrick. In July 2000, Pope John Paul II decided not to appoint McCarrick as bishop of Washington. After McCarrick made efforts to persuade the Pope of his innocence, the Pope appointed McCarrick Archbishop of Washington, D.C. in November 2000. McCarrick was formally installed as the fifth archbishop of Washington at the Cathedral of St. Matthew the Apostle on January 3, 2001. On February 21, 2001, John Paul made him a cardinal, assigning him as cardinal priest to the titular church of Santi Nereo e Achilleo. He was one of the cardinal electors who participated in the 2005 papal conclave that elected Pope Benedict XVI.

Between 2001 and 2006, McCarrick gave $600,000 to high-ranking church officials, including two popes, multiple priests, cardinals, and archbishops. According to The Washington Post, "Several of the more than 100 recipients were directly involved in assessing misconduct claims against McCarrick". Some of those recipients, however, had little oversight over these transactions.

In June 2004, McCarrick was accused of intentionally misreading a letter from Cardinal Joseph Ratzinger recommending that Catholic politicians who supported abortion rights be denied the Eucharist. McCarrick led a successful push to have the USCCB allow the bishops of individual dioceses to determine who was or was not eligible to receive the sacrament of communion. Fr. Richard John Neuhaus said, "The bishops I have talked to have no doubt that [McCarrick's] presentation did not accurately represent the communication from Cardinal Ratzinger." McCarrick said that he did not want to cause "a confrontation with the Sacred Body of the Lord Jesus in my hand," and added that "the individual should be the one who decides whether or not he is in communion with the Church" and therefore eligible to receive the sacrament. McCarrick later met with then U.S. Senator John Kerry, a Catholic and the Democratic nominee in that year's presidential election. Some Catholics felt Kerry should not have been allowed to receive Communion due to his political position favoring abortion rights.

Although McCarrick was sometimes labelled a liberal, he was noted for adhering to church teaching on abortion, same-sex marriage, and the male-only priesthood.

== Post-retirement activities ==
Heraldic achievements as Archbishop of Washington

As an archbishop (2000–2001)

As a cardinal (2001–2018)

On May 16, 2006, Pope Benedict XVI accepted McCarrick's resignation as Archbishop of Washington, after the latter's reaching the customary age limit of 75, and appointed Donald Wuerl, Bishop of Pittsburgh, as the 6th Archbishop of Washington, DC. From May 16, 2006, until Wuerl's installation on June 22, 2006, McCarrick served as the Apostolic Administrator of the Archdiocese of Washington, an interim post.

After his retirement, McCarrick resided for some time at the Redemptoris Mater seminary in the Archdiocese of Washington. He subsequently moved to the grounds of the provincial headquarters of the Institute of the Incarnate Word in Chillum, Maryland, in a building on a complex that included a seminary. McCarrick was named a counselor at the Center for Strategic and International Studies in 2007.

In 2009, McCarrick presided over the graveside service of U.S. Senator Edward M. Kennedy at Arlington National Cemetery, where he read from a letter Kennedy had written to Pope Benedict XVI. In 2015, he served as one of the concelebrants at the funeral of Delaware Attorney General Beau Biden, son of President Joe Biden, (then Vice President) and presided over the closing Mass as well.

Within the church, McCarrick "was always seen as a moderate, centrist presence in the hierarchy, a telegenic pastor who could present the welcoming face of the Church, no matter what the circumstances". A news article identified him in 2014 as "one of a number of senior churchmen who were more or less put out to pasture during the eight-year pontificate of Benedict XVI", adding that after the election of Pope Francis he found himself put "back in the mix." He was described as a "pope maker" by David Gibson, a longtime religion reporter and author of "The Coming Catholic Church".

During his retirement, McCarrick pressed House Speaker John Boehner to take up immigration reform. McCarrick spent a significant amount of time traveling and engaging in inter-religious dialogue. In April 2014, at the request of the U.S. State Department, McCarrick made a trip to the Central African Republic, a country suffering from ethnic and interreligious violence. In May 2014, he traveled with Pope Francis to the Holy Land. McCarrick traveled to Armenia to discuss Syria with Eastern Orthodox clerics, the Philippines to visit victims of Typhoon Haiyan, China for discussions on religious freedom, Iran for talks on nuclear proliferation, and served as a Vatican intermediary for the U.S.-Cuba talks.

On January 27, 2017, in response to rumors that President Donald Trump was planning to appoint Catholic commentator George Weigel ambassador to the Holy See, then-Cardinal McCarrick wrote to Pope Francis stating that Weigel was "very much a leader of the ultra-conservative wing of the Catholic Church in the United States and has been publicly critical of Your Holiness in the past." He added, "Many of us American bishops would have great concerns about his being named to such a position in which he would have an official voice, in opposition to your teaching." McCarrick indicated interest in discussing the topic further with the Pope, but there are no indications in their correspondence of whether he did so.

== Sexual misconduct ==
=== Reports of sexual misconduct ===
In 1994, a priest wrote a letter to Bishop Edward T. Hughes, McCarrick's successor as Bishop of Metuchen, stating that McCarrick had inappropriately touched him. Also in 1994, Agostino Cacciavillan, then papal nuncio to the United States, received a phone call from a woman who was concerned that there would be a media scandal if Pope John Paul II went to Newark during his 1995 visit to the United States because of "voices (rumors) about McCarrick's behavior with seminarians." Cacciavillan then told Cardinal John O'Connor, Archbishop of New York, about the woman's call. O'Connor conducted an "investigation, an inquiry" and eventually told Cacciavillan that "there was no obstacle to the visit of the Pope to Newark." Cacciavillan stated that he did not inform the Vatican. According to Italian journalists Andrea Tornielli and Gianni Valente, Cardinal O'Connor, in fact, "objected strongly to John Paul II's idea of rewarding McCarrick and the diocese of Newark with a stop during his papal visit to the United States in 1995"; however, John Paul's personal secretary, Stanisław Dziwisz, was able to intercept these objections before they reached the pope. The authors suggest that this was because McCarrick was an efficient fundraiser for the Pope's causes, including anti-Communist efforts in Poland.

Boniface Ramsey stated that he spoke to Thomas C. Kelly, Archbishop of Louisville, about McCarrick in 1993. In 2000, Ramsey wrote to the nuncio, Gabriel Montalvo Higuera, to complain about McCarrick's behavior. The letter was forwarded to Leonardo Sandri, the Vatican substitute for general affairs. Ramsey said that he tried to speak with Cardinal Edward Egan, then Archbishop of New York, about McCarrick's history, but that Egan "didn't want to hear it". In February 2019, the same month McCarrick was laicized by the Vatican, an image of an October 11, 2006 letter from Sandri to Ramsey that laid out Ramsey's account of his involvement in the McCarrick affair was published by the media. The image showed that McCarrick's name and archbishop status were concealed in the letter whenever Sandri mentioned them.

In 1999, Pope John Paul II informed O'Connor that he was considering appointing McCarrick as archbishop of Washington, D.C. O'Connor sent a letter to Gabriel Montalvo Higuera, the papal nuncio to the United States, advising him of reports of misconduct by McCarrick. Cacciavillan, who had been the papal nuncio at the time of many of the allegations, cast doubt on O'Connor's report. After an investigation, Montalvo reported that the accusations against McCarrick were "neither definitively proven nor completely groundless" and advised against appointing McCarrick to Washington. In July 2000, the Pope decided not to appoint McCarrick to Washington. However, one month later, McCarrick himself wrote a letter to Pope John Paul II's secretary to vehemently deny O'Connor's allegations:

Your Excellency, sure I have made mistakes and may have sometimes lacked in prudence, but in the 70 years of my life, I have never had sexual relations with any person, male or female, young or old, cleric or lay, nor have I ever abused another person or treated them with disrespect ... If I understand the accusations that Cardinal O'Connor may have made, they are not true.

Pope John Paul II was convinced by McCarrick's letter, and the two met at the Vatican in October 2000. Pope John Paul II appointed McCarrick Archbishop of Washington, D.C. in November 2000.

In 2015, Ramsey wrote to Cardinal Seán Patrick O'Malley, Archbishop of Boston, about McCarrick. O'Malley stated that he never saw the letter, and that it had been handled "at the staff level." Richard Sipe stated that he wrote a letter to Benedict XVI in 2008, saying that McCarrick's activities "had been widely known for several decades." Sipe sent a letter to Bishop Robert W. McElroy in 2016, concerning sexual misconduct by McCarrick. McElroy asked if Sipe would be willing to share corroborating material that would substantiate his allegations, but Sipe said that he was precluded from sharing specific documentary information. McElroy said "[T]he limitations on his willingness to share corroborating information made it impossible to know what was real and what was rumor."

Mike Kelly of the New Jersey Record reported that Cardinal Joseph W. Tobin of Newark had said that around the time he became archbishop in 2016, he heard "rumors" about McCarrick having slept with seminarians; however, he chose not to believe them, stating that they seemed too "incredulous" to be true. Kelly also mentioned that in 1998, based on a tip, he himself had attempted to investigate the rumors about McCarrick, but that "no seminarians would talk".

In 2018, news outlets reported that priests and former seminarians under McCarrick had alleged that McCarrick had engaged in inappropriate conduct with male seminarians. These included reports that he made sexual advances toward young men training as seminarians during his tenure as Bishop of Metuchen and Archbishop of Newark. McCarrick reportedly routinely invited some of these young men to a house on the shore with so few beds that a man would have to share the bishop's bed. According to one former seminarian, Desmond Rossi, he and a friend later realized that the archbishop would cancel weekend gatherings "if there were not enough men going that they would exceed the number of available beds, thus necessitating one guest to share a bed with the archbishop".

Wuerl denied having any prior knowledge of claims regarding sexual abuse on the part of McCarrick. On January 10, 2019, The Washington Post published a story stating that Wuerl was aware of allegations against McCarrick in 2004 and reported them to the Vatican. In a January 12, 2019, letter, Wuerl stated that when "the allegation of sexual abuse of a minor was brought against Archbishop McCarrick, I stated publicly that I was never aware of any such allegation or rumors." But the context, he said, was in discussions about sexual abuse of minors, not adults. He later said, in a letter dated January 15, to the priests of the archdiocese, that the survivor in the previous Pittsburgh case had asked that the matter be kept confidential, and he heard no more about it: "I did not avert to it again"; "only afterwards was I reminded of the 14-year-old accusation of inappropriate conduct which, by that time, I had forgotten."

In August 2019, letters and postcards that McCarrick sent to his alleged victims were made public. Two abuse prevention experts who reviewed the letters and postcards for the Associated Press described the correspondence as "a window into the way a predator grooms his prey."

=== Additional allegations, removal from ministry, and resignation as cardinal ===
On June 20, 2018, McCarrick was removed from public ministry by the Holy See after a review board of the Archdiocese of New York found an allegation "credible and substantiated" that he had sexually abused a 16-year-old altar boy while a priest in New York. Patrick Noaker, the attorney for the anonymous complainant, alleged two incidents at St. Patrick's Cathedral, one in 1971 and the other in 1972. Noaker stated that when measuring the teen for a cassock, McCarrick "unzipped [the boy's] pants and put his hands in the boy's pants." McCarrick stated that he was innocent of these charges: "I have absolutely no recollection of this reported abuse, and believe in my innocence." He also stated, "In obedience I accept the decision of The Holy See, that I no longer exercise any public ministry." Also on June 20, 2018, Tobin revealed that during McCarrick's ministry in New Jersey, there had been accusations of sexual misconduct with three adults; two of the allegations had resulted in confidential financial settlements with the complainants.

On July 5, 2018, Fordham University rescinded an honorary degree and other honors it had granted McCarrick. The Catholic University of America, where McCarrick earned two degrees and served in a variety of spiritual and administrative positions, also revoked the honorary degree it had awarded him in 2006.

On July 16, 2018, The New York Times published a front-page article describing McCarrick's abuse of adult seminarians. On July 19, The New York Times published an article based on the story of a man named James, whose last name was withheld. A New Jersey man whose uncle had known McCarrick since high school, James alleged that McCarrick had sexually abused him beginning at age 11. James had been the first boy McCarrick had ever baptized. James said that McCarrick had exposed himself to him when he was 11 and had sexually touched him beginning when he was 13. He explained that he tried to tell his father a couple of years later but was not believed. On November 13, James revealed himself as James Grein and gave a public speech at the "Silence Stops Now Rally" in Baltimore, where he called on Catholics to "reform and reclaim the Church." Speaking about alleged mishandling of allegations by Catholic bishops, he said, "Our bishops must know that the jig is up."

On July 27, 2018, Pope Francis ordered McCarrick to observe "a life of prayer and penance in seclusion" and accepted his resignation from the College of Cardinals. McCarrick's resignation was the first resignation from the College of Cardinals since Louis Billot, a French prelate, resigned in 1927 when he refused an order to withdraw his support of Action Française, a monarchist movement that Pope Pius XI had condemned. McCarrick was also the first cardinal to resign after allegations of sexual abuse. The Pope took this action before the accusations had been investigated by church officials. This was the first time an order of penance and prayer has been issued before a church trial. McCarrick was not laicized (removed from the priesthood) at the time, pending the completion of a canonical trial. The Holy See announced on July 28, 2018 that Pope Francis had ordered Archbishop McCarrick (as he then became known) to obey an "obligation to remain in a house yet to be indicated to him" and also observe "a life of prayer and penance until the accusations made against him are examined in a regular canonical trial."

=== 2018 Viganò letter ===
On August 25, 2018, Archbishop Carlo Maria Viganò, former Apostolic Nuncio to the United States, released an 11-page letter describing a series of warnings to the Vatican regarding McCarrick. Viganò stated that Gabriel Montalvo, then nuncio to the United States, had informed the Vatican in 2000 of what Viganò characterized as McCarrick's "gravely immoral behaviour with seminarians and priests." He further stated that Archbishop Pietro Sambi, the nuncio from 2005 to 2011, had also informed the Vatican. Viganò says that in 2006 – when working at the Vatican – he wrote his own memo regarding McCarrick. He said nothing was done, however, to stop McCarrick. In 2008, Viganò says he wrote a second memo, including material from Sipe.

In 2009 or 2010, according to Viganò, Pope Benedict XVI placed severe restrictions on McCarrick's movements and public ministry, not allowing him to travel beyond the grounds of the seminary where he was living and not permitting him to say Mass in public. According to Viganò, however, Pope Francis subsequently removed these sanctions and made McCarrick "his trusted counselor", even though Francis "knew from at least June 23, 2013 that McCarrick was a serial predator. He knew that he was a corrupt man, he covered for him to the bitter end." Italian journalists Tornielli and Valente, however, report that "it was in 2007 – not 2009, as Viganò has said – that Pope Benedict XVI issued his 'instructions' to McCarrick." McCarrick responded in a 2008 letter to Vatican Secretary of State, Tarcisio Bertone, writing that he had shared his bed with seminarians. He said that "this was never done in secret or behind closed doors," and that he had never "had sexual relations with anyone, man, woman or child, nor have I ever sought such acts."

Viganò called on Pope Francis and all others whom he said covered up McCarrick's conduct to resign. It was observed that during the time McCarrick was allegedly under sanction, he maintained a "robust public presence" full of international travel, public masses, speeches, and the acceptance of awards, although in July 2010, on the occasion of his eightieth birthday, he declined an interview with The Washington Post. The reporter said that the Cardinal seemed to be avoiding the media. Both Cardinal Marc Ouellet, having been asked to come forward in 2018 by Viganò, and the "2020 Vatican Report on McCarrick" largely confirmed Viganò's statements that the Vatican under Benedict XVI imposed restrictions on McCarrick, although McCarrick proved often unwilling to follow them. The report also found that Viganò actively sought harsh sanctions for McCarrick while working as an official in the Secretariat of State. Both Ouellet and the report, however, disputed Viganò's accusations against Francis, with the report admitting only that Francis heard of rumors about sexual impropriety by McCarrick but believed them to be discredited, and did not hear reports about abuse of minors until 2018.

Viganò stated that he discussed McCarrick's conduct and the penalties surrounding it with McCarrick's successor as Archbishop of Washington, Cardinal Wuerl, whom he says transgressed the Pope's order by allowing McCarrick to continue living at the seminary and therefore putting other seminarians at risk. Wuerl, through his spokesperson, Ed McFadden, denied that he was aware of any restrictions on McCarrick. "Archbishop Viganò presumed that Wuerl had specific information that Wuerl did not have," McFadden said. McCarrick's situation reportedly became easier when Nuncio Pietro Sambi died unexpectedly in July 2011 and was succeeded by Viganò, who, according to Tornielli and Valente, proved less eager to enforce Benedict XVI's instructions to McCarrick. Viganò subsequently acknowledged that Pope Benedict had made the restrictions private, perhaps "due to the fact that he (Archbishop McCarrick) was already retired, maybe due to the fact that he (Pope Benedict) was thinking he was ready to obey."

The McCarrick case (along with the conclusion of the Grand jury investigation of Catholic Church sexual abuse in Pennsylvania, which alleged systematic cover-up of clergy sex abuse by bishops in Pennsylvania over decades) triggered a general call from Catholics across ideological boundaries for greater accountability and transparency in the church. The case has also escalated tensions in the Catholic Church between ideological liberals and conservatives, especially over the possible role of homosexuality in clergy sex abuse and the alleged complicity of Pope Francis in protecting McCarrick.

On May 28, 2019, McCarrick's private secretary, Anthony J. Figueiredo, released letters written by McCarrick suggesting that while senior Vatican officials placed restrictions on the former Cardinal after abuse allegations surfaced, they were not official sanctions and were not strictly enforced under the papacies of Pope Benedict XVI or Pope Francis. In an interview published on May 28, 2019, Francis directly addressed the accusations made in Viganò's letter for the first time. He stated that he "knew nothing" about McCarrick's conduct. McCarrick claimed to have discussed restrictions that were placed on him with Wuerl, but Wuerl denied that he had any knowledge of such restrictions.

=== Vatican trial and laicization ===
On February 16, 2019, the Holy See Press Office announced that McCarrick had been laicized. The Congregation for the Doctrine of the Faith (CDF), in a church penal process, found McCarrick guilty of "solicitation in the Sacrament of Confession, and sins against the Sixth Commandment with minors and with adults, with the aggravating factor of the abuse of power". The guilty verdict was issued by the CDF on January 11, 2019, and McCarrick appealed. The CDF rejected the appeal on February 13 and McCarrick was notified on February 15. The decision was final, and McCarrick had no further opportunity to appeal. The CDF used an expedited administrative process designed for cases in which evidence is overwhelming. McCarrick's ordination as a priest and consecration as a bishop could not be undone according to sacramental theology. Following his laicization, McCarrick could not licitly (lawfully) perform any priestly duties, including celebrating Mass; he could, however, administer the sacrament of Penance to a penitent in danger of death. His laicization was permanent. McCarrick was the most senior church official in modern times to be laicized.

In an interview with Slate published in September 2019, McCarrick stated, "I'm not as bad as they paint me [...] I do not believe that I did the things that they accused me of." McCarrick stated he believed the persons making accusations against him were "encouraged to do that" by his "enemies". He added that in the past, many young men had come to his beach house without having any problems.

=== Seton Hall Title IX investigation ===
On September 5, 2019, it was revealed that an investigation conducted by Seton Hall University found that McCarrick's acts of sexual abuse against seminarians at the university were classified as a Title IX offense. Incidents of sex abuse McCarrick committed at both Immaculate Conception Seminary and St. Andrew's Seminary were said to have not been reported to the university because at the time, they were not compliant with Title IX. The report, which was reviewed by the law firm of Latham & Watkins, also accused McCarrick of creating a "culture of fear and intimidation" at Seton Hall University when he led the university as Archbishop of Newark.

=== Vatican report ===
On November 10, 2020, the Vatican released a report about the handling of allegations against McCarrick. It states that through an October 1999 letter from Cardinal O'Connor, Pope John Paul II learned of allegations of sexual deviancy against McCarrick while in the process of considering him for the position of Archbishop of Washington, but that an investigation was paused after three of the four bishops tasked with looking into the accusations provided "inaccurate and incomplete information." John Paul II then decided not to appoint him, but changed his mind after receiving a letter from McCarrick proclaiming his innocence. The report suggested that John Paul II was probably influenced by his experience in his native Poland where the communist government used "spurious allegations against bishops to degrade the standing of the Church". The report states that Benedict XVI asked for McCarrick's resignation as Archbishop of Washington in 2005, after learning about the 1994 letter to Hughes. The Vatican Office for Bishops ordered McCarrick to retire to private life verbally in 2006, and put it in writing in 2008, but both times he ignored their instructions. Benedict was also faulted in the report, however, for not standing in the way of McCarrick's growing power. According to the report, Pope Francis, prior to becoming pope, had learned of allegations against McCarrick before McCarrick was named Archbishop of Washington, but believed that John Paul II had rejected them. Francis knew of rumors surrounding sexual conduct between McCarrick and adults but received no documentation of sexual impropriety against McCarrick until 2017, and was not aware of accusations of sexual abuse against minors until 2018.

=== Lawsuits and settlements ===
In 2005, the Archdiocese of Newark and the Dioceses of Trenton and Metuchen paid a total of $80,000 to a former priest who stated that McCarrick touched him above the waist while in bed. The Diocese of Metuchen's contribution was not in reference to McCarrick, but to an allegation regarding previous conduct of a teacher at a high school located at that time in the diocese.

Between 2005 and 2007, the Diocese of Metuchen and the Archdiocese of Newark paid financial settlements to two priests who had accused McCarrick of abuse. These settlements totalled $180,000. In 2006, $100,000 was paid by the Diocese of Metuchen, where McCarrick had been bishop from 1981 to 1986. The payments were authorized by Bishop Paul G. Bootkoski, who also reported the offenses to law enforcement. According to Donald Cardinal Wuerl, McCarrick's successor as Archbishop of Washington, nobody from these dioceses informed him of these settlements, even after the retired McCarrick began living on the grounds of a seminary in the Archdiocese of Washington. In 2010, Sipe published excerpts from the 2005 and 2007 settlement documents.

In August 2019, one of McCarrick's alleged victims, James Grein, filed a lawsuit against McCarrick and the Archdiocese of New York. In December 2019, Grein extended his lawsuit to the New Jersey-based Archdiocese of Newark and Diocese of Metuchen, claiming that the two dioceses committed gross negligence when they allowed McCarrick, who Grein stated was a friend of his family, to continue to visit and sexually abuse him. That same month, a new law went into effect throughout New Jersey which allowed more sex victims to file lawsuits. This resulted in more of McCarrick's alleged New Jersey victims filing lawsuits against McCarrick and the two dioceses he served in that state. One of these cases was also reported to be the first sex abuse lawsuit brought against the Holy See, which was accused of receiving reports of sex abuse committed by McCarrick in 1988 and 1995.

In December 2019, McCarrick was sued by a man named John Bellocchio, who said that McCarrick sexually abused him when he was a 14-year-old boy in the 1990s.

In February 2020, America magazine revealed that the Diocese of Metuchen, the Archdiocese of Newark, and Diocese of Trenton had, beginning in 2005, worked together to secretly pay victims of McCarrick. Former substitute for general affairs at the Vatican Secretariat of State Leonardo Sandri, who received a letter of concern from Ramsey in 2000, was suspected of participating in the cover-up of McCarrick's acts; America journalist Thomas J. Reese recommended that he and others be interviewed as part of the Vatican's investigation into the former cardinal.

A lawsuit was filed on July 21, 2020 by an anonymous person saying that McCarrick operated a sex ring out of his New Jersey beachouse. The alleged victim maintained that McCarrick abused him with the assistance of other priests beginning in 1982, when he was 14. The lawsuit stated that boys were assigned different rooms in the house and paired with adult clergymen. The alleged victim, who attended schools operated by the Archdiocese of Newark, alleged that priests and others under the control of McCarrick engaged in "open and obvious criminal sexual conduct" that was kept cloaked by the church and also served as "procurers" for McCarrick. The Archidocese of Newark; the Diocese of Metuchen, where McCarrick was serving as bishop of at time of the alleged abuse; and the Catholic schools the alleged victim attended were named as defendants in the lawsuit as well. On September 9, 2020, a new lawsuit was filed which alleged that McCarrick kept a second beach house which he also used as a sex ring when he was Bishop of Metuchen. It was also revealed that the Archdiocese of Newark had purchased one of McCarrick's Diocese of Metuchen beach houses in 1997, when he was serving as archbishop, just four months before selling the other beach house, which it also purchased from the Diocese of Metuchen.

On November 19, 2020, four people who accused McCarrick of sexually abusing them filed a lawsuit against the Holy See in federal court in Newark, New Jersey, saying it had failed in its oversight of McCarrick over whom it exercised complete control as his employer. The Holy See says priests are not its employees and that its status as a foreign sovereign is a defense from such a suit. In November 2021, a new lawsuit was filed against both McCarrick and the Archdiocese of Newark by Michael Reading, a priest who claimed McCarrick sexually abused him during a visit to the New Jersey shore in 1986.

=== Criminal charges ===
On July 29, 2021, McCarrick was charged with sexually assaulting a 16-year-old male in 1974 during a wedding reception for the boy's brother on the grounds of Wellesley College in Massachusetts. The complaint was filed by Wellesley Police in Dedham District Court. On September 3, 2021, McCarrick pleaded not guilty in Dedham District Court to three counts of indecent assault and battery stemming from the alleged 1974 incident. In an early 2023 court filing, McCarrick's lawyers stated that he had experienced "significant" and "rapidly worsening" cognitive decline, and was thus not fit to stand trial. In June of that year, a state-appointed forensic psychologist found "deficits of his memory and ability to retain information". In August 2023, the court ruled that McCarrick was mentally incompetent to stand trial.

On April 16, 2023, McCarrick was charged with one count of fourth-degree sexual assault for a 1977 incident that occurred near Geneva Lake in Wisconsin. McCarrick allegedly fondled the victim's genitals at a Geneva Lake residence and also abused the victim on other occasions.

== Final years ==
On September 28, 2018, it was announced that McCarrick had moved to the Capuchin St. Fidelis Friary in Victoria, Kansas. The announcement was unpopular with many of the citizens of Victoria, especially because the friary is near an elementary school.

In early 2020, McCarrick left the friary of his own accord; his presence had reportedly become a strain on the Franciscan community hosting him. He relocated to the Vianney Renewal Center in Dittmer, Missouri.

McCarrick died on April 3, 2025 at a nursing facility in Missouri where he had moved shortly before his death, aged 94 years old.

== Honorary degrees ==
McCarrick was awarded at least 35 honorary degrees. Many of these degrees were revoked or are under consideration for revocation.

Location	Date	School	Degree	Status
New York (state)	1967	College of Mount Saint Vincent	Doctor of Laws (LL.D.)	rescinded
New York (state)	June 1974	St. John's University	Doctor of Humane Letters (DHL)	rescinded
Maryland	May 16, 1987	Mount St. Mary's College	Doctorate	
New Jersey	May 17, 1987	Felician College	DHL	
Rhode Island	May 18, 1987	Providence College	Doctor of Divinity	rescinded
New Jersey	1987	Saint Peter's College	Doctorate	rescinded
New Jersey	1994	University of Medicine and Dentistry of New Jersey	DHL	(Note: University was dissolved in 2013)
New York (state)	2002	Fordham University	Doctorate	rescinded
Washington, D.C.	2004	Georgetown University	DHL	rescinded
Washington, D.C.	May 13, 2006	Catholic University of America	DHL	rescinded
New York (state)	May 20, 2006	Canisius College	DHL	
Massachusetts	May 21, 2006	Stonehill College	Doctor of Humanities	
New York (state)	2007	Siena College	Doctorate of Sacred Theology	rescinded
Indiana	May 18, 2008	University of Notre Dame	LL.D.	rescinded
Oregon	2008	University of Portland	Doctorate	rescinded
Pennsylvania	2008	Gannon University	DHL	
Montana	September 14, 2009	Carroll College	Doctorate	
New York (state)	May 2011	St. Bonaventure University	DHL	rescinded
New York (state)	October 12, 2012	College of New Rochelle	Doctorate	rescinded
Palestine	November 3, 2013	Bethlehem University	Doctor of Humanities	

== See also ==
- Hans Hermann Groër (1919–2003) – Austrian cardinal who was the subject of multiple allegations of child sexual abuse

== Notes ==
Catholic Church titles
Preceded by James Aloysius Hickey	Archbishop of Washington; November 21, 2000 – May 16, 2006	Succeeded by Donald Wuerl
Preceded by Peter Leo Gerety	Archbishop of Newark; May 30, 1986 – November 21, 2000	Succeeded by John J. Myers
Preceded by Lawrence Aloysius Burke	Ecclesiastical Superior of Turks and Caicos; October 17, 1998 – November 21, 2000	Succeeded by John J. Myers
New title First Bishop	Bishop of Metuchen; November 19, 1981 – May 30, 1986	Succeeded by Edward Thomas Hughes
Preceded by Léon Théobald Delaere	— TITULAR — Titular Bishop of Rusibisir; June 29, 1977 – November 19, 1981	Succeeded by Ivan Dias
Preceded by Bernardino Echeverría Ruiz	Cardinal-Priest of Santi Nereo e Achilleo; February 21, 2001 – July 28, 2018	Succeeded by Celestino Aós Braco
