= St. Francis of Assisi Cathedral (Metuchen, New Jersey) =

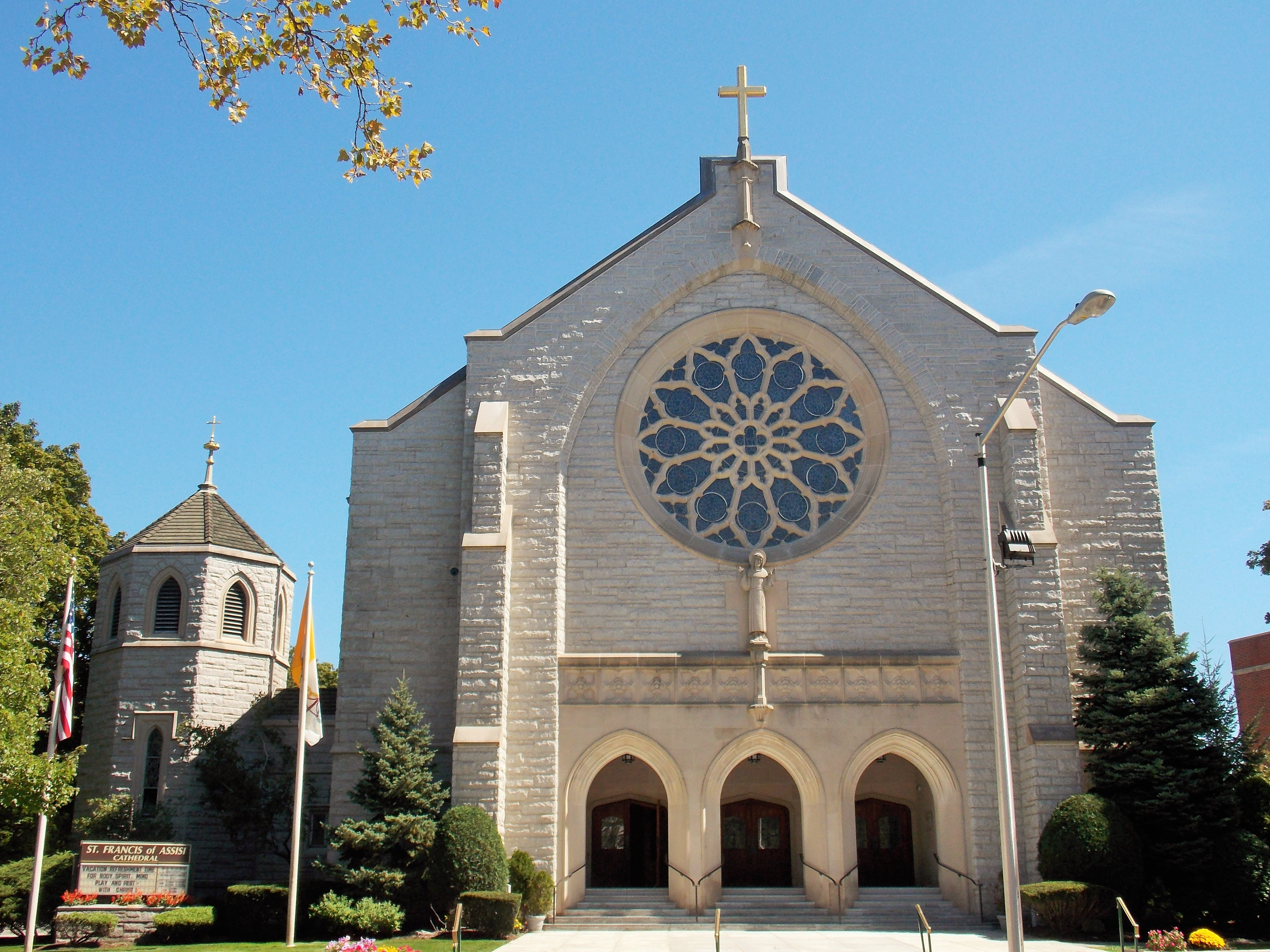

- Location in Middlesex County, New Jersey
- 40°32′45″N 74°21′48″W
- Location: 32 Elm Ave. Metuchen, New Jersey
- Country: United States
- Denomination: Roman Catholic Church
- Website: www.stfranciscathedral.org

History
- Founded: 1878
- Dedicated: May 19, 1963
- Consecrated: 1981

Architecture
- Style: Gothic Revival
- Completed: 1963

Specifications
- Materials: Limestone

Administration
- Diocese: Metuchen

Clergy
- Bishop: Most Rev. Michael A. Saporito
- Rector: Rev. Timothy A. Christy

St. Francis of Assisi Cathedral is a Catholic cathedral located in Metuchen, New Jersey, in the United States. It is the seat of the Diocese of Metuchen.

== History ==
=== St. Francis of Assisi Parish ===
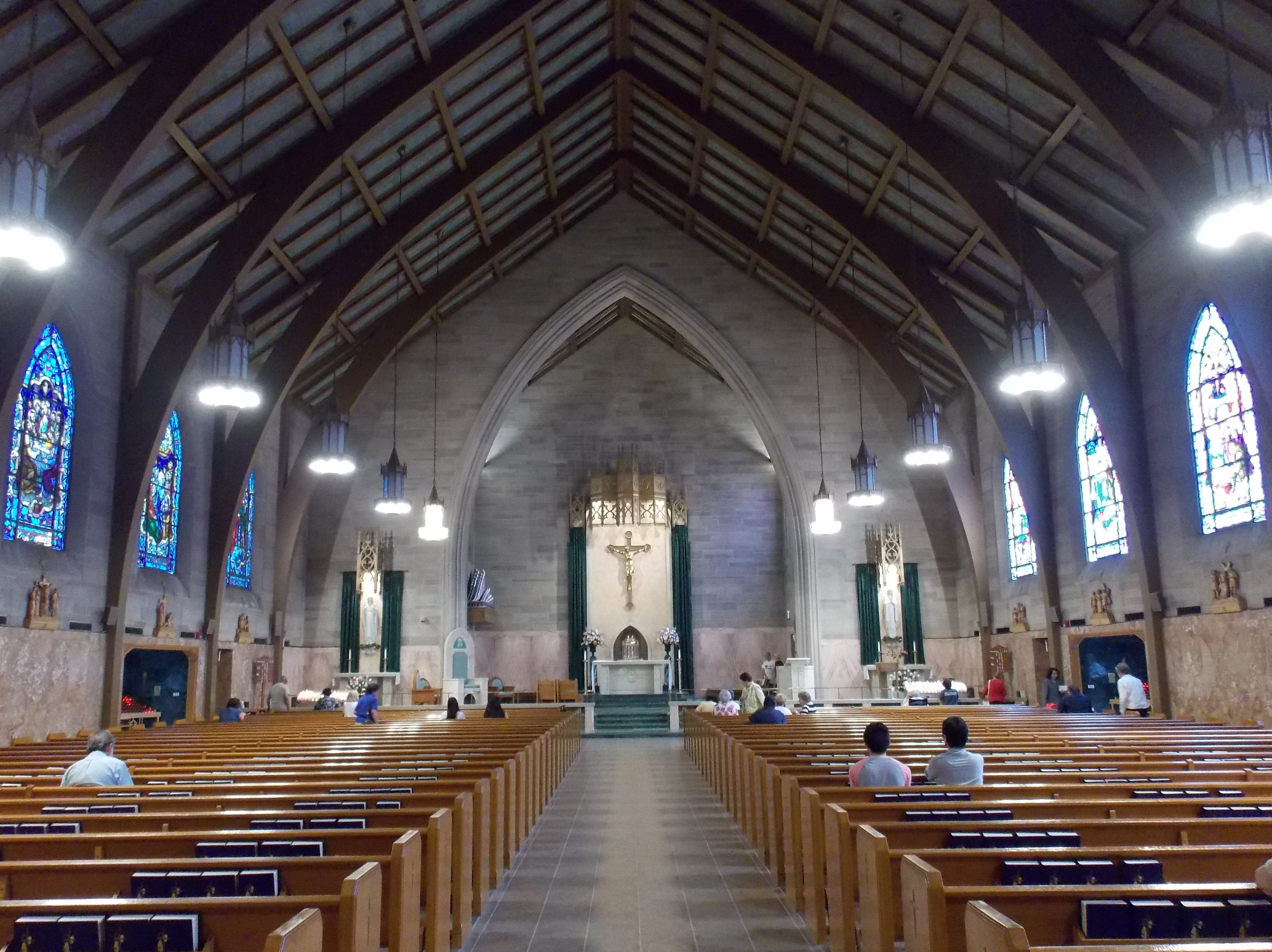
View of altar from nave (2014)

St. Francis began as a small frame mission church built in 1871 and dedicated to St. Joseph. St. Francis Parish was incorporated in that same church on January 26, 1878. A fire destroyed the church building on December 21, 1903. The second church, also built of wood, was dedicated in December 1904. Columbia Hall was built in 1920.

The parish grew to more than 2,000 families by 1960 and the pastor, the Rev. John J. Foley had plans made for a new church. Columbia Hall was destroyed in a fire at this time and the plans were changed to include a parish hall and gymnasium as well. The rectory was completed in June 1961 and the ground breaking for the new church began on July 24 of the same year. Masses were held in various locations until the CYO Hall was completed in December 1961. The present church was dedicated on May 19, 1963.

=== St. Francis of Assisi Cathedral ===
On November 19, 1981 Pope John Paul II established the Diocese of Metuchen. St. Francis was chosen as the cathedral for the new diocese.

On April 30, 2019, St. Michael's Choir School sang at Saint Francis of Assisi Cathedral as part of their 2019 New York Tour.

== Architecture ==
The Cathedral of St. Francis was built in the Gothic Revival style and seats about 1,000 people. The interior walls are composed of limestone with marble wainscotting. The floors are terrazzo and the woodwork is oak. The altars are carved from Italian marble. A bronze crucifix is above the altar as a part of the baldacchino. The facade features a rose window

== Rectors ==
The following priests have served as the rector of St. Francis of Assisi Cathedral since 1981:

- Dominic Turtora
- Richard A. Behl
- Michael J. Alliegro
- Robert J. Zamorski
- Timothy A. Christy
Cathedral images

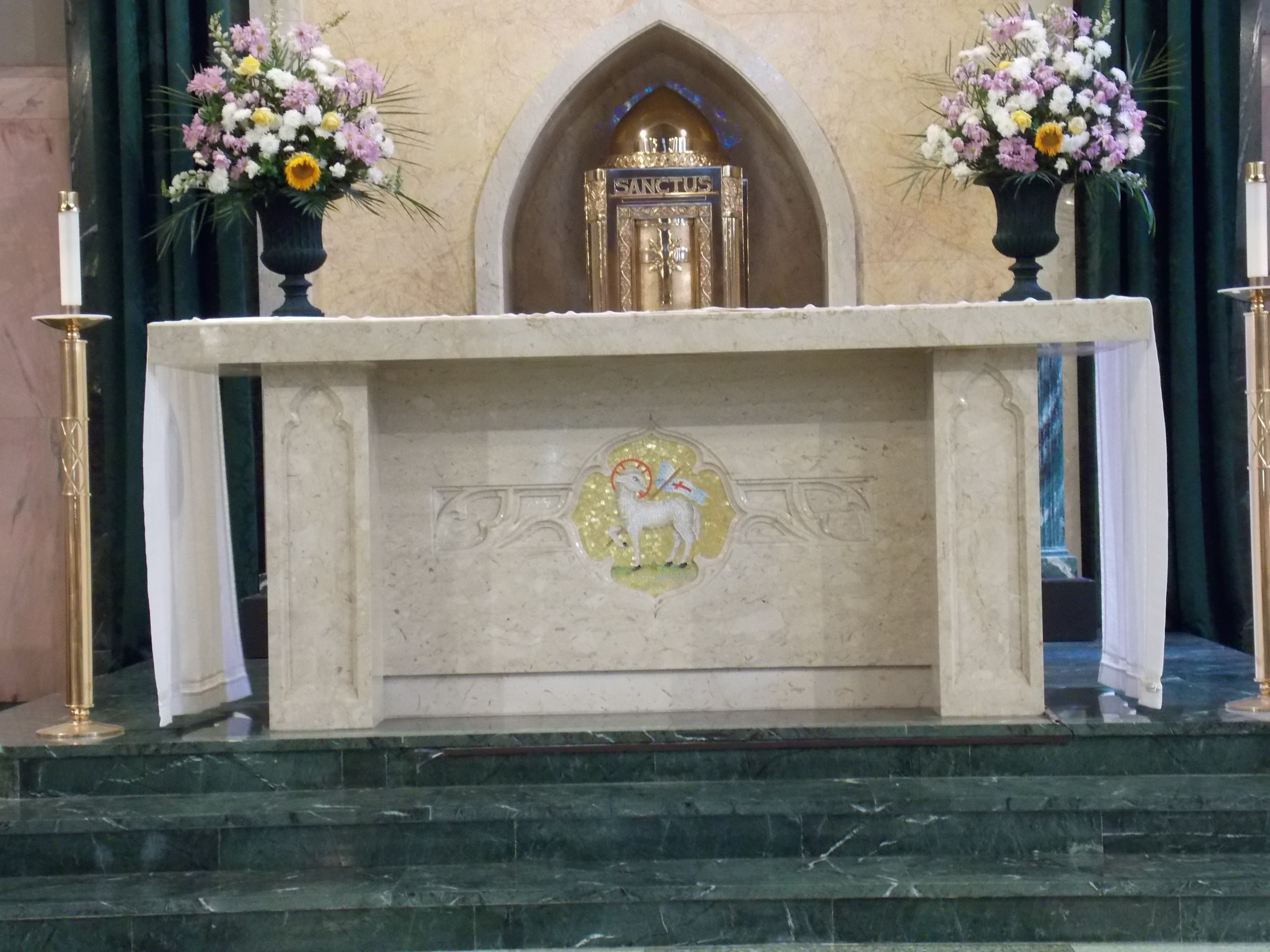
Altar (2014)

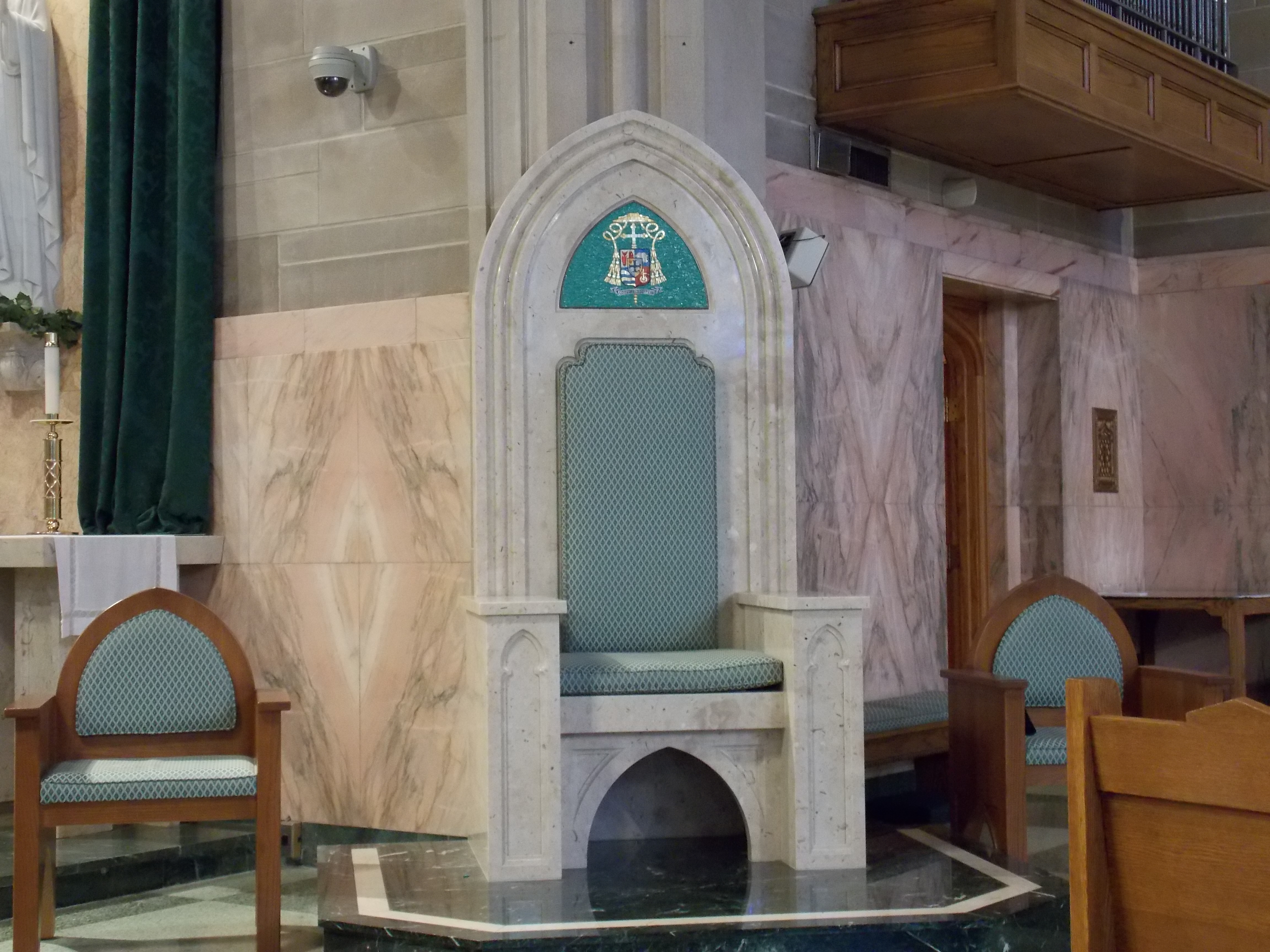
Cathedra (2014)

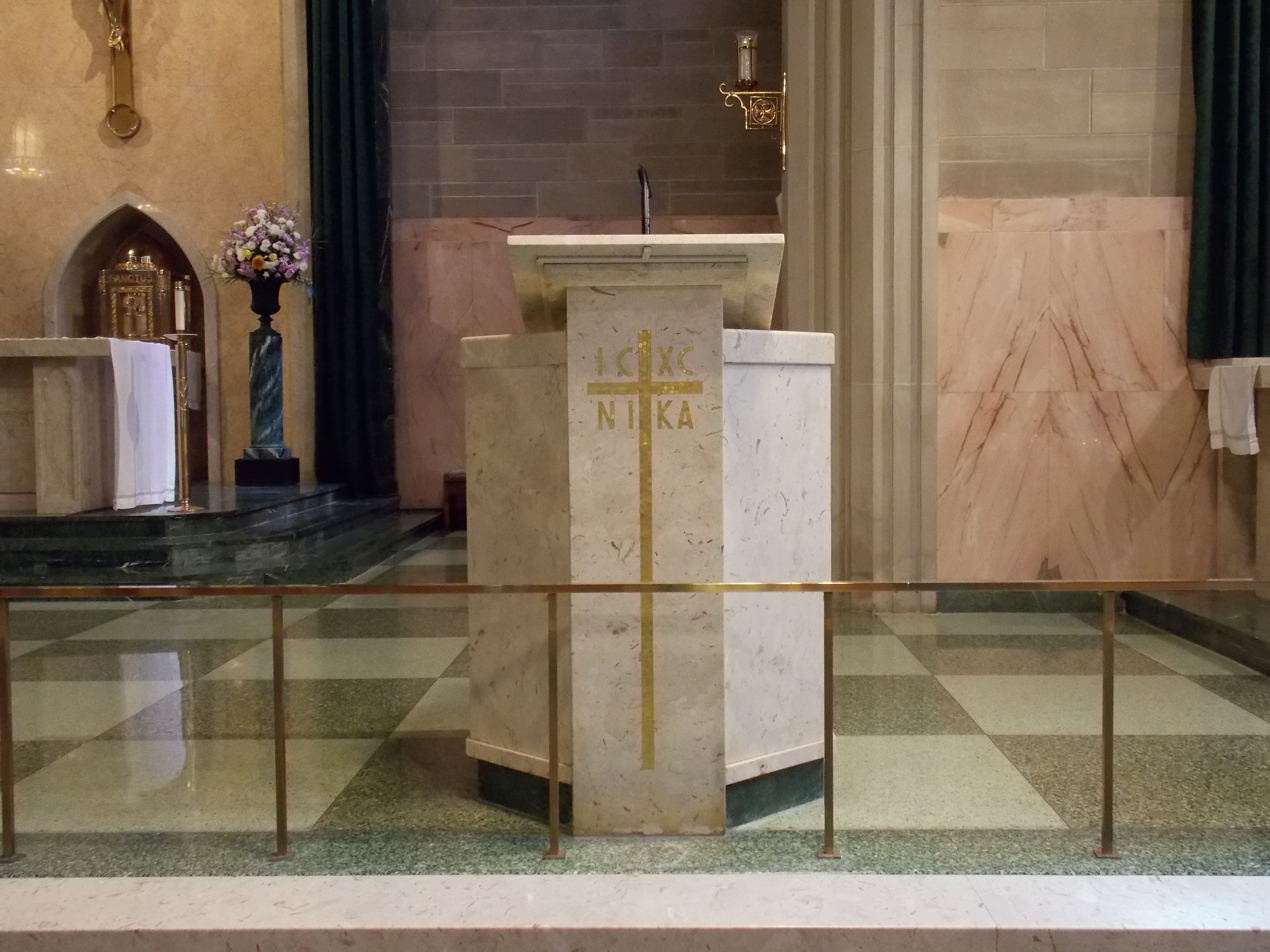
Ambo (2014)

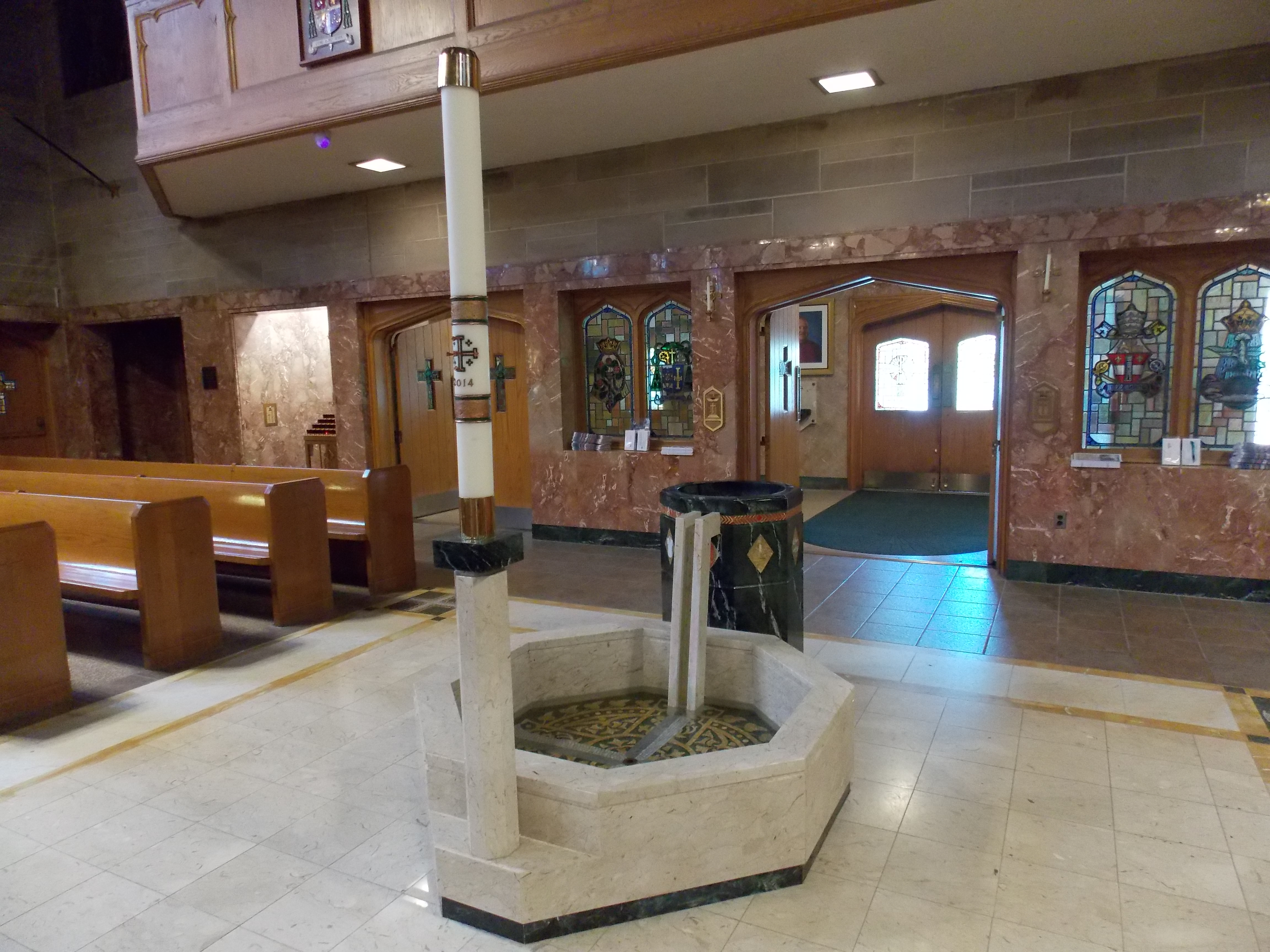
Baptismal font (2014)

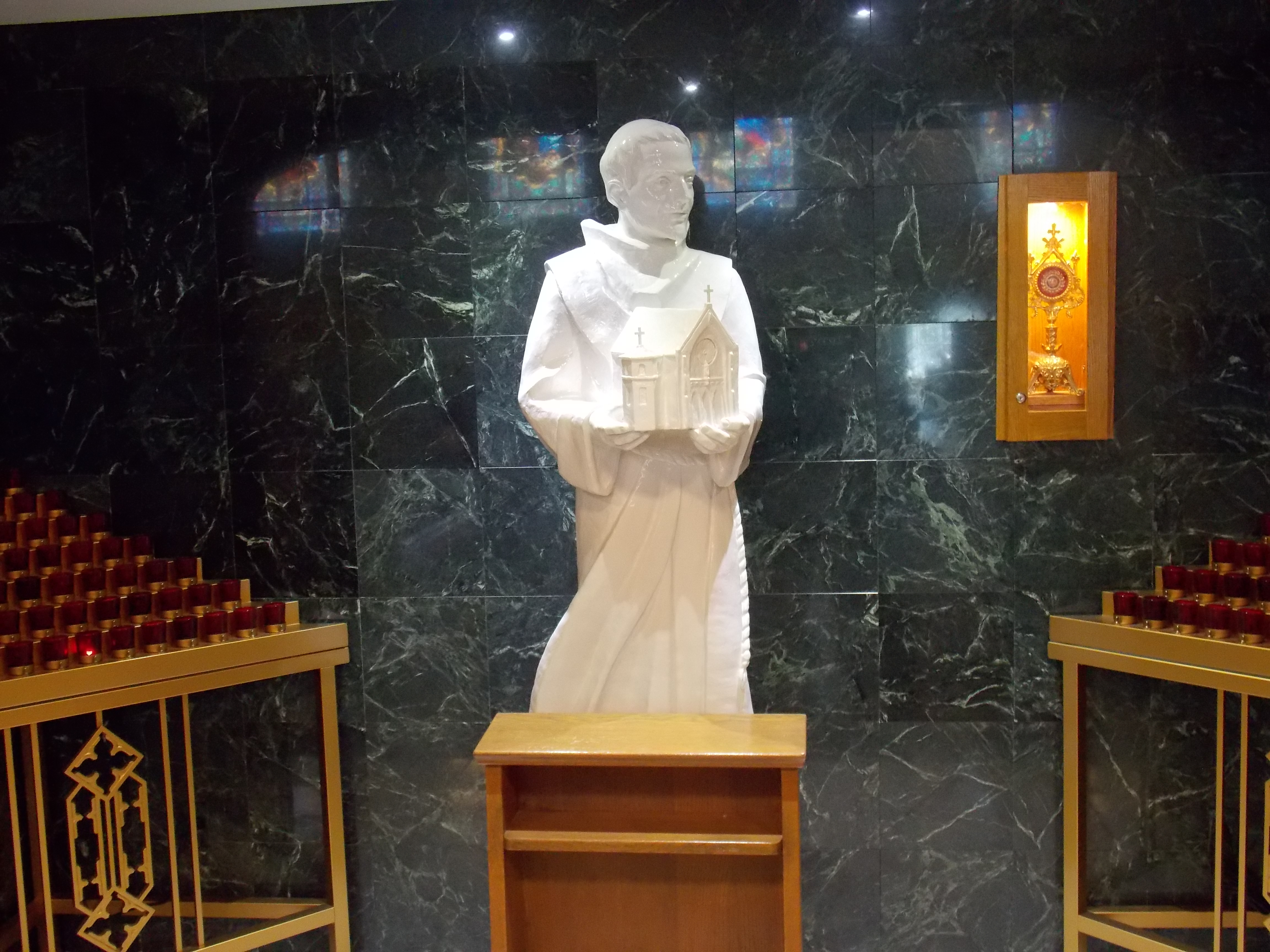
Statue of St. Francis of Assisi (2014)

== See also ==
- List of Catholic cathedrals in the United States
- List of cathedrals in the United States
