= Diocese of Metuchen =

Latin Catholic ecclesiastical jurisdiction in New Jersey, US

Diocese of Metuchen Dioecesis Metuchenis

Catholic
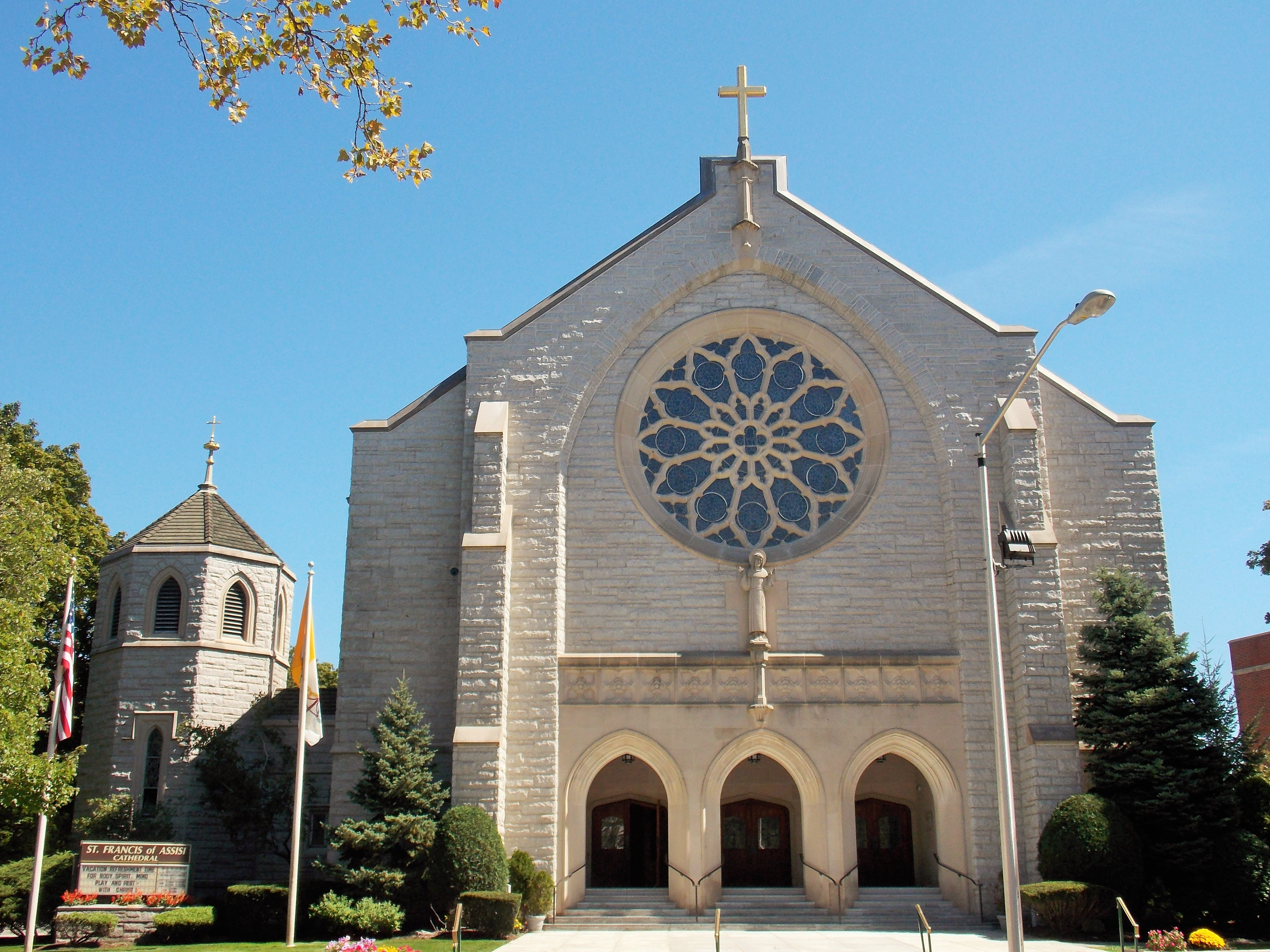
- St. Francis of Assisi Cathedral

- Coat of Arms

Location
- Country: United States
- Territory: New Jersey counties of Hunterdon, Middlesex, Somerset and Warren
- Episcopal conference: United States Conference of Catholic Bishops
- Ecclesiastical region: Region III
- Ecclesiastical province: Province of Newark
- Coordinates: 40°32′32.8″N 74°21′45.96″W

Statistics
- Area: 3,697 km^{2} (1,427 sq mi)
- Population: Total; Catholics: (as of 2023); ▲1,447,109; ▲636,728 ( 44%)
- Parishes: 90

Information
- Denomination: Catholic
- Sui iuris church: Latin Church
- Rite: Roman Rite
- Established: November 19, 1981 (44 years ago); inc. December 31, 1981
- Cathedral: St. Francis of Assisi Cathedral
- Patron saint: Queenship of Mary
- Secular priests: ▼153 diocesan (2023); ▲37 religious priests; ▲171 permanent deacons

Current leadership
- Pope: Leo XIV
- Bishop: Michael A. Saporito
- Metropolitan Archbishop: Joseph W. Tobin
- Bishops emeritus: Paul Gregory Bootkoski

Map
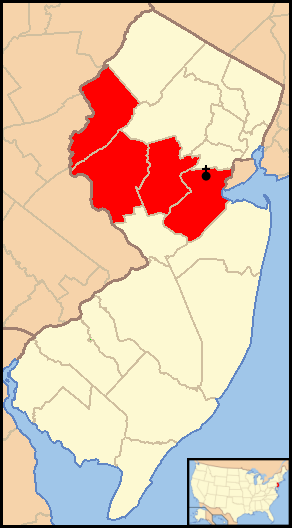

Website
- diometuchen.org

The Diocese of Metuchen (Latin: Dioecesis Metuchenis) is a diocese of the Catholic church in the borough of Metuchen in New Jersey in the United States. It was established in 1981. The mother church is Saint Francis of Assisi Cathedral in Metuchen.

== Territory ==
The Diocese of Metuchen encompasses the New Jersey counties of Middlesex, Somerset, Hunterdon and Warren.

== History ==
During the 17th century, only a few scattered pockets of Catholics resided in present-day New Jersey. At that time, the British had split the area into separate provinces of East Jersey and West Jersey. East Jersey, which included Middlesex County, was hostile toward Catholics. At the beginning of the 18th century, the British consolidated the two New Jerseys into a single province.

After the end of the American Revolution, the religious freedom of Catholics was enshrined in state constitutions and the US Constitution. Pope Pius VI then established the Apostolic Prefecture of the United States in 1784 to remove American Catholics from the jurisdiction of a British bishop.The French envoy François Barbé-Marbois in 1785 estimated the Catholic population in both New York and New Jersey at approximately 1,700, with most of them living in New Jersey. Priests traveled to New Jersey from St. Peter's Parish in New York City to minister to the Catholics there.In 1789, Pius XI elevated the prefecture to the new Diocese of Baltimore, including the entire nation.

=== 1800 to 1900 ===
On April 8, 1808, Pope Pius VII erected the Diocese of Philadelphia and the Diocese of New York, taking New Jersey from the Diocese of Baltimore. The state was divided between the two dioceses. In New Brunswick, the first Catholic parish was St. Peter's, founded in 1829 to serve Irish immigrants. In Somerville, St. Peter's Church was erected in the early 1830s. In Bridgewater, St. Bernard was established as a mission church in 1843.St. Mary's Parish, founded in Perth Amboy in 1844 for Irish immigrants, was the first Catholic church in that community.

Responding to the population growth in New Jersey, the Vatican in 1853 erected the Diocese of Newark, taking its territory from the dioceses in Philadelphia and New York. St. Ann's Parish in Hampton, the first Catholic church in Hunterdon County, was erected in 1859. In 1860, the first Catholic church in Phillipsburg, Saint Philip & Saint James, was dedicated.

The first German Catholic parish in New Brunswick, St. John the Baptist, was founded in 1865. A few years later, in 1972, Saint Peter's General Hospital was opened in New Brunswick by the Grey Nuns of Montreal. It is today Saint Peter's University Hospital, the only Catholic hospital in the diocese. St. Francis was the first parish in Metuchen; the congregation opened with a wooden church in 1877.

In 1881, the Diocese of Trenton was erected by the Vatican: its territory came from the Diocese of Newark. The Metuchen area would remain part of the Diocese of Trenton for the next 100 years.

=== 1900 to 2000 ===
On November 18, 1981, Pope John Paul II erected the Diocese of Metuchen, taking Middlesex, Somerset, Hunterdon and Warren Counties from the Diocese of Trenton. The pope named Auxiliary Bishop Theodore McCarrick of New York as the first bishop of the diocese.

During his tenure, McCarrick erected new parishes in Perth Amboy, Califon, Skillman, Old Bridge, and Three Bridges. He also oversaw the development of the Diocesan Council of Catholic Women, and the Bishop's Annual Appeal. He helped establish ministries for African-Americans, Hispanics, anti-abortion activities, and the disabled. McCarrick was appointed archbishop of Newark in 1986.

Auxiliary Bishop Edward Hughes of Philadelphia replaced McCarrick as the second bishop of Metuchen. Hughes retired as bishop of Metuchen in 1997. John Paul II in 1997 appointed Bishop Vincent Breen from the Diocese of Brooklyn as the next bishop of Metuchen.

=== 2000 to present ===
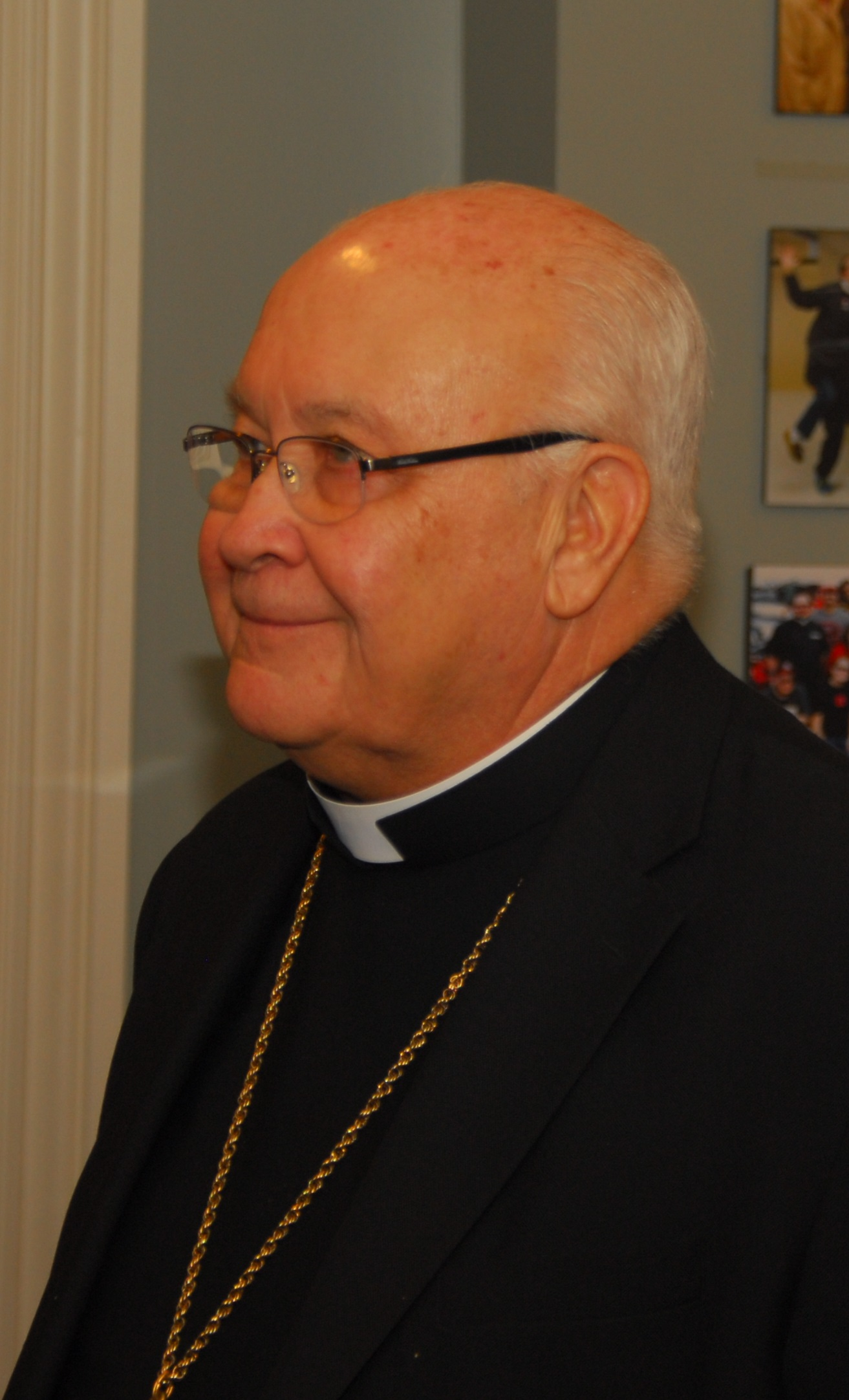
Bishop Bootkoski (2014)

The diocese in 2001 opened Immaculate Conception School in Annandale for pre-K through fourth grade. The following school year, the school expanded enrollment through eighth grade.Also in 2001, the diocese dedicated the St. John Neumann Pastoral Center in Piscataway.

After Breen resigned as bishop of Metuchen in 2003, Auxiliary Bishop Paul Gregory Bootkoski of Newark succeeded him. In 2006, Bootkoski launched the diocese's first synod. In January 2010, the diocese opened a new Catholic Center at Rutgers University in New Brunswick.

After Bootkoski retired as bishop of Metuchen in 2016, Pope Francis appointed James Checchio, rector of the Pontifical North American College in Rome, as the new bishop of Metuchen. In August 2021, Douglas J. Haefner, pastor of St. Matthias Parish in Somerset, pleaded guilty to one count of second-degree theft. He had taken $516,984.56 of parish funds. Haefner was sentenced to seven years in prison.

On September 24, 2025, Checchio was appointed coadjutor archbishop of the Archdiocese of New Orleans by Pope Leo XIV.

On September 15, 2026, Pope Leo XIV appointed Bishop Michael A. Saporito, auxiliary bishop of Newark, as the sixth bishop of Metuchen.

=== Sexual abuse ===
==== 1990 to 2000 ====
In August 1997, police arrested Michael Santillo, who served at St. Mary's Church in Perth Amboy before leaving the priesthood in 1992. Santillo pleaded guilty in June 1999 to one count of aggravated sexual assault and was sentenced to ten years in prison.

John M. Banko, a priest from Mary Mother of God Parish in Hillsborough, was charged in August 2001 with first-degree aggravated sexual assault and child endangerment. He was convicted of sexual assault in December 2002 and sentenced to 15 years in prison.

==== 2000 to 2010 ====
In 2003, Bishop Bootkoski established the Office of Child and Youth Protection and implement the Protecting God's Children program. That same year, he approved an $800,000 financial settlement to ten victims of sexual abuse by five clerics, including Santillo and Banko. According to Cardinal Donald Wuerl, nobody from the Diocese of Metuchen informed him of these settlements, even after the retired McCarrick began living on the grounds of a seminary in the Archdiocese of Washington.

Tomasz Adam Zielinski, a priest from Christ the King Parish in Manville, was arrested on sexual assault charges in July 2008. A 16-year-old girl who had been sitting next to Zielinski on a flight from Poland to the United States accused him of fondling her and attempting to unzip her pants. He pleaded guilty and was sentenced in January 2009 to one year in federal prison.

==== 2010 to 2020 ====
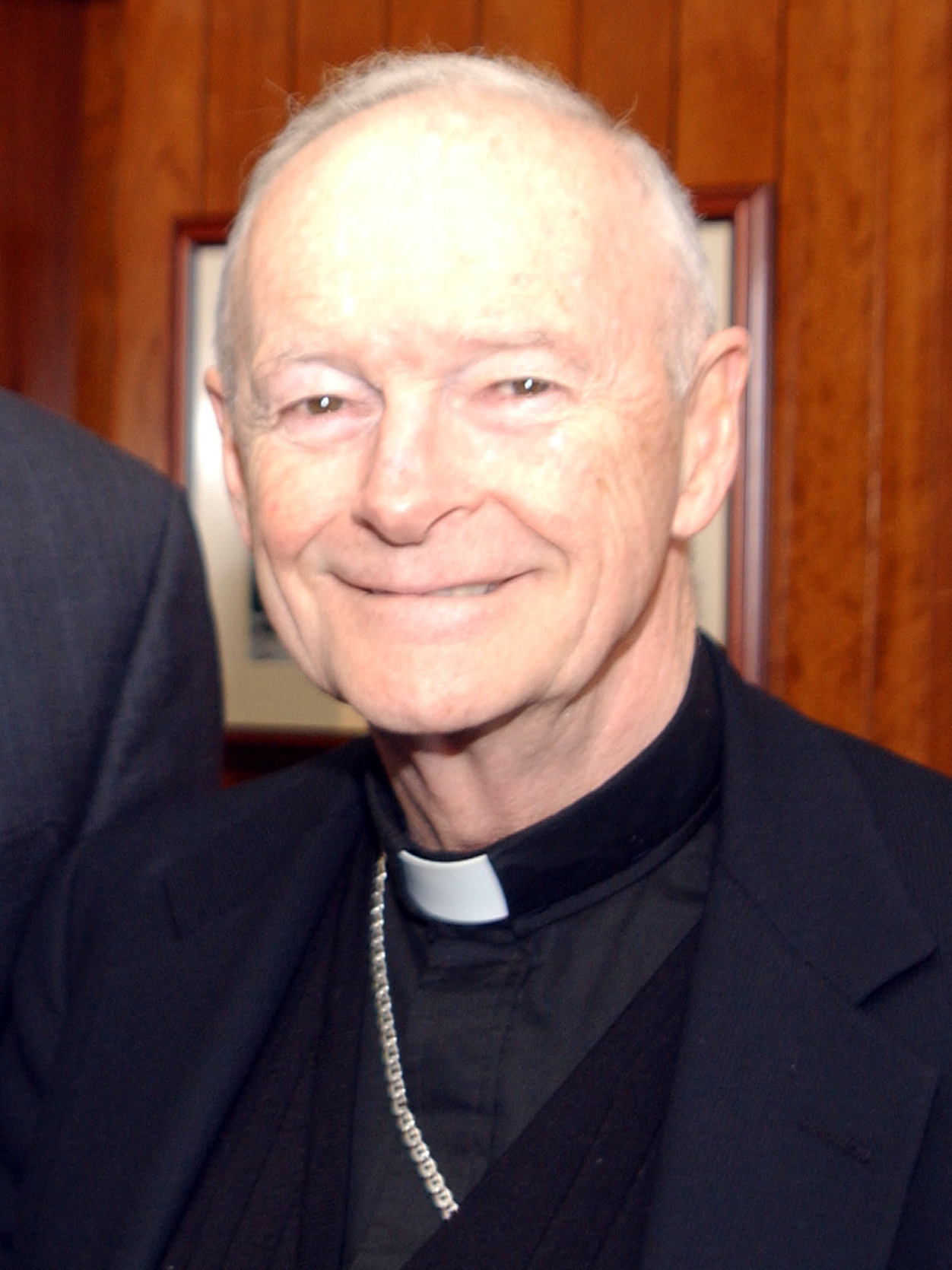
Former Cardinal McCarrick (2002)

In July 2018, former priest Robert Ciolek, in an interview with the New York Times, accused McCarrick of sexually molesting him in the 1980s when Clolek was a seminarian and McCarrick was bishop of Metuchen. McCarrick had been removed from ministry in June 2018 when the Archdiocese of New York determined that an accusation of him sexually abusing a 16-year-old boy 50 years earlier was credible. It was revealed that in 2005 and 2007, the Diocese of Metuchen, along with the Archdiocese of Newark, secretly paid financial settlements to Clolek and another priest abused by McCarrick.

In September 2018, the United States Conference of Catholic Bishops announced an investigation of sexual abuse in the Diocese of Metuchen along with the other New Jersey dioceses. It was widely assumed that the McCarrick allegations had triggered this move by the bishops. McCarrick, already removed from ministry, was laicized in 2019. In February 2019, the diocese released a list of 11 clergy with credible accusations of sexual abuse against minors. These clergy had been reported to law enforcement agencies.

Thomas Ganley, the parochial vicar at St. Philip and St. James Parishes, pleaded guilty to sexual assault in April 2019 and was sentenced to four years in prison in August of that year.He had sexually assaulted a 16-year-old girl during the 1990s when he was a pastor at Saint Cecelia Church in Woodbridge.In December 2019, the New Jersey Legislature passed a law allowing a two-year legal lookback window, enabling sexual abuse lawsuits that were previously barred by the statute of limitations.

==== 2020 to present ====
In 2020, the diocese updated its list of accused clergy to add seven more names.Axel Palomares, a Spanish teacher and girls' soccer coach at St. Thomas Aquinas High School, was arrested in May 2025. He was charged with creating and possessing child sexual abuse material, child endangerment, and invasion of privacy. Palomares had been secretly photographing children in underwear at the high school and in local mall restrooms between 2022 and 2025.

== Bishops of Metuchen ==
1. Theodore Edgar McCarrick (1981–1986), appointed Archbishop of Newark in 1986, Archbishop of Washington in 2000, and cardinal in 2001. He was removed from ministry in 2018 and laicized in 2019
2. Edward Thomas Hughes (1986–1995)
3. Vincent DePaul Breen (1997–2002)
4. Paul Gregory Bootkoski (2002–2016)
5. James Francis Checchio (2016–2025), appointed Coadjutor Archbishop of New Orleans in 2025
6. Michael A. Saporito (2026-present)

== Monasteries ==
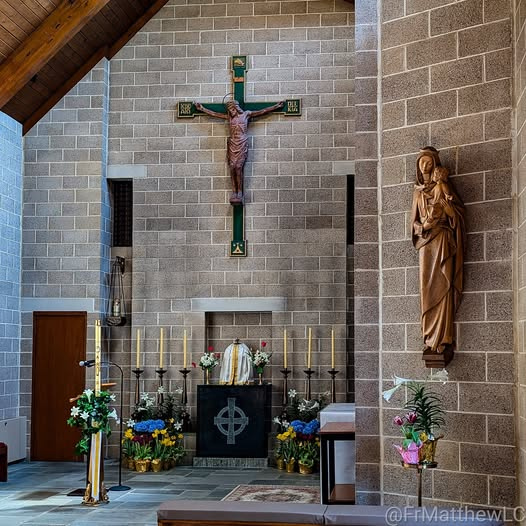
The Chapel of the Carmelite Nuns in Flemington, New Jersey

The female Discalced Carmelite monastery of Mary Immaculate and St Mary Magdalen is in Flemington.

== Education ==
As of 2026, the Diocese of Metuchen has two Catholic high schools and 21 elementary schools.

=== High schools ===
- Immaculata High School – Somerville
- St. Thomas Aquinas High School – Edison

== Coat of arms ==
The coat of arms for the Diocese of Metuchen contains two silver grants and two blue grants. The four qgrants are separated by a blue cross. One gold grant contains a blue crowned M, the second gold qgrant contains a red tongue of fire.

- The four grants represent the four counties in the diocese.
- The blue cross comes from the diocesan coat of arms.
- The red tongue of fire symbolizes the Lenni Lenape word for firewood, metachen, along with the descent of the Holy Spirit to earth on the Pentecost holy day.
- The crowned "M" symbolizes Mary, mother of Jesus, the principal patroness of the diocese. The crowned "M" also appears on the coat of arms of former Cardinal McCarrick and Pope John Paul II.
