= Charles Mathew =

Charles Mathew may refer to:

- Charles Mathew (Labour politician) (1872–1923), British barrister and member of parliament (MP) for Whitechapel and St Georges, 1922–1923
- Charles Mathew (Corfe Castle MP), member of Parliament for Corfe Castle, 1572–1581

== See also ==
- Charles Mathews (disambiguation)
