= Church of the Resurrection (Rye, New York) =

Catholic church in Rye, New York

- Church of the Resurrection
- 40°58′32″N 73°41′07″W
- Location: Rye, New York
- Denomination: Catholic Church
- Website: resrye.org

History
- Status: Parish church
- Founded: 1880
- Dedication: Resurrection of Jesus

Architecture
- Style: Gothic Revival
- Completed: 1931

Administration
- Archdiocese: Archdiocese of New York

Clergy
- Pastor: Rev. Msgr. Donald M. Dwyer

The Church of the Resurrection is a Roman Catholic church located in Rye, New York. The parish was founded in 1880, and the current church building was completed in 1931.

== History ==
The Church of the Resurrection was established in 1880 by the Archbishop of New York, Cardinal John McCloskey, as a parish for Rye and Harrison, New York. Prior to the church's founding, Catholic residents of Rye and Harrison attended mass at Our Lady of Mercy Church in Port Chester. The first masses were said in a rented hall on the northeast corner of Cedar and Purchase Streets in Rye beginning on June 6, 1880. Eventually, the parish purchased the William Smith house in 1881 at the intersection of Purchase Street and the Boston Post Road, where services were then offered. The parish was incorporated on January 29, 1886, and title to the property was transferred from the archdiocese to the parish itself.

A new church building was completed in 1889 on Purchase Street, while the former building was used as the rectory. Thereafter, construction of a parochial school on the Boston Post Road began in 1906 and was completed two years later. With the number of parishioners growing, the church purchased land on Boston Post Road in 1927, on which ground was broken that year for the construction of the current church building, which cost approximately $400,000. The church was completed in 1931, and the first mass was said on Easter of that year. Designed by architects Henry D. Murphy and Edward Lehmann, the massive Gothic Revival structure was dubbed the "Cathedral of Westchester".

=== Music ===
In 1979, John-Michael Caprio became the church's director of music; he would go on to be director of music at New York city's St. Patrick's Cathedral. In 1989, Dr. William Maul was appointed director of music at the Church of the Resurrection. He retired in 2011, and was succeeded by Joseph Viserta.

== Resurrection School ==
The original Resurrection Grammar School building was located at 1085 Boston Post Road, at the intersection of Purchase Street, adjacent to the original site of the church. Once the church moved to its present site, the school building was converted into a residence for nuns, before becoming a private apartment house, which it remains today. The current grammar school building, designed in the Tudor Revival style, was built behind the church, with frontage along Milton Road. It originally housed pupils in grades 1–8.

In 1950, the Academy of the Resurrection, an all-girls preparatory school, was opened, adjacent to the church property along Boston Post Road. The school shuttered in the early 1990s, at which point it was converted for usage by Resurrection Grammar School students in grades 4–8, and became known as Resurrection Middle School. The Montessori level through grade 3 remained in the original grammar school building.

== See also ==
- List of parishes in the Roman Catholic Archdiocese of New York
