= Adam Cvijanovic =

American painter (born 1960)

- Born: Adam L. Cvijanovic; 28 October 1960 (age 65); Cambridge, Massachusetts, US
- Education: Self taught
- Known for: Painting
- Awards: Art Production Fund

Adam Cvijanovic (born 28 October 1960) is a painter based in New York City who was born in Cambridge, Massachusetts. He paints in large-scale format often using Tyvek sheeting as a substrate, which allows his work to be easily installed at multiple locations. His work is concerned with exposing the historical and enduring hubris of American culture, painting forms that depict the search for and physical manifestation of American power and success on a monumental scale. He is represented by Postmasters Gallery in New York.

== Career ==
Though Cvijanovic is a self-taught artist, he has lectured widely and had exhibitions throughout many prominent galleries.

He had a solo exhibition at UCLA Hammer Museum in 2005 and exhibited with Peter Garfield at MASS MoCA in 2007. His paintings have also been featured in exhibitions at P.S. 1 Contemporary Art Center in New York and the "USA Today" exhibition, curated from the collection of Charles Saatchi at the Royal Academy in London. "USA Today" traveled to the State Hermitage Museum, St. Petersburg, Russia. In 2008 he had works exhibited at the New Orleans Biennial, the Walker Arts Center, and the Liverpool Biennial at the Tate Liverpool.

In 2013, he was commissioned to create the painting 10,000 Feet, a large scale mural of Indiana countryside at the Alexander Hotel in Indianapolis, Indiana.

From 2024 to 2025 Cvijanovic created the twelve-panel mural What's So Funny About Peace, Love, and Understanding in the narthex of St. Patrick's Cathedral in New York City; the first major addition to the cathedral in 75 years. The mural was unveiled on September 17, 2025, in the cathedral by the Archbishop of New York Cardinal Timothy Dolan.

== Personal life ==
Cvijanovic was married to the cabaret singer and psychic Peri Lyons from 1992 to 2007. He married Julia Carbonetta in August of 2012.
