= John-Michael Caprio =

Music director

- John-Michael Caprio in 1996
- Born: July 1947; Newark, New Jersey, U.S.
- Died: December 25, 1997 (aged 50); New York City
- Education: Manhattan School of Music, BMus; Juilliard School
- Occupations: conductor, organist
- Known for: Director of Music, St. Patrick's Cathedral (Manhattan)

John-Michael Caprio (July 1947 – December 25, 1997) was an American conductor and organist who served as the music director at St. Patrick's Cathedral in New York City between 1990 and 1997. During his seven years at the renowned Manhattan landmark on Fifth Avenue, he implemented an expanded concert program, worked to enhance the quality of music in liturgical services, and conducted the cathedral's choirs and notable soloists. Caprio arranged and conducted performances televised in the U.S., the United Kingdom, and Ireland, along with producing compact disc recordings of the cathedral's choir and organ. Caprio's tenure saw the rebuilding of the cathedral's historic pipe organ and his organization of music for the massive Central Park rally celebrating the visit of Pope John Paul II in 1995.

Caprio was also director of the Roman Catholic Archdiocese of New York Music Commission, beginning in 1983. Prior to his appointment at St. Patrick's Cathedral, he founded the Ars Nova Chorale and Orchestra in 1976 and the Riverside Symphonia in 1990.

== Early years and education ==
Caprio was born in July 1947 in Newark, New Jersey, the son of Mary and Michael Caprio. His father was a city of Newark employee. After graduating from Newark Arts High School, he pursued higher education at the Manhattan School of Music, earning a Bachelor of Music degree, followed by advanced studies in music at the Juilliard School and then further studies in conducting with Emanuel Balaban.

== Career as a musician ==
Early in his music career, Caprio taught at the old Paul VI Regional High School in Clifton, New Jersey, and started the music department at Pope John XXIII Regional High School in Sparta, New Jersey. He formed a well-received touring chorus, with the youthful singers performing at various venues such as Trinity Church in Manhattan and the Basilica of the National Shrine of the Immaculate Conception in Washington, D.C. Caprio served as organist at the Pro-Cathedral of Saint Patrick in Newark in the early 1970s. Impressed with the success of Caprio's touring chorus, Bishop Lawrence B. Casey of the Roman Catholic Diocese of Paterson, New Jersey, requested Caprio to form a choir for Pontifical High Masses. In 1973, Casey appointed Caprio director of music for the diocese. Caprio also conducted at the Spoleto Festival in Italy.

While serving as organist and music director at the church of St. Philip the Apostle in Clifton in 1976, Caprio founded the Ars Nova Chorale and Orchestra, a 125-voice choral group which he described as ranging from "recent college graduates to some of the most seasoned performers". With Caprio conducting, they performed an ambitious concert program including full orchestra. Their inaugural program included Ralph Vaughan Williams's cantata, Hodie. By 1978, Ars Nova was performing Rossini's Stabat Mater and the Symphony No. 3 in C minor ("Organ") by Camille Saint-Saëns. Working with local elected officials in Passaic County to promote the area's musical arts and obtain financial support, Caprio called for greater cultural awareness. Music historian Salvatore Basile wrote that this was typical of Caprio's "Barnumesque taste for large projects, richly produced", calling it "excitingly unusual showmanship", and describing him as having "a personality that combined the aplomb of a Toscanini with an unmistakable New Jersey scrappiness".

In 1979, Caprio was appointed music director at the Church of the Resurrection in Rye, New York, while simultaneously instituting the New York School of Liturgical Music at the behest of Cardinal Cooke to enhance the quality of music in Catholic churches in the New York Archdiocese. These additional demands on his time required Caprio to discontinue the Ars Nova Chorale and Orchestra concerts by 1981. Caprio became director of the Archdiocesan Music Commission in 1983, the first layman to be selected for that high-profile position, which afforded him the opportunity to be frequently quoted by the New York news media pertaining to music in the Catholic church, quipping at one point to an interviewer, "The Romans have taken a bad rap, musically, for years".

In addition to his other conducting and administrative responsibilities, Caprio became director of music in January 1989 at the Church of St. John the Evangelist in Lambertville, New Jersey. The church credited him with enhancing the quality of its sacred music by training members to serve as cantors, thereby leading to greater congregational participation in singing, while fostering the choir's quality and heightened awareness of its role in liturgical ministry. While at St. John's in 1990, Caprio formed an ensemble of professional instrumentalists and singers from the area, calling it the Riverside Symphonia, to perform both secular and sacred masterworks for enthusiastic audiences. Even after he was appointed music director at St. Patrick's Cathedral, Caprio continued to conduct the Riverside Symphonia's four concerts per year. Over the Fourth of July weekend in 1994, for example, he conducted the Symphonia's 50 professional musicians in an outdoor concert at Erwinna, Pennsylvania, presenting diverse works by George Gershwin, Richard Rodgers, and Tchaikovsky. Caprio also scheduled Symphonia children's matinee performances. "The key to their success", he told the Courier-News, "is that the principal players introduce themselves and their instrument. The clarinetist, for example, plays Rhapsody in Blue ...". The Symphonia continues to the present day, dedicated to musical excellence for the Delaware River Valley region.

== At St. Patrick's Cathedral ==
Caprio was appointed interim director of music at St. Patrick's Cathedral in New York City in 1990, following the death of John Grady, the cathedral's previous organist and music director, on September 27. There was reluctance initially to make Caprio the permanent director, because he was more noted as a conductor instead of an organist, and some choir members found his personality "brash". Cardinal O'Connor also wanted a music director for the cathedral who could encourage greater congregational singing and was skeptical that Caprio could do so. But by June 27, 1991, Caprio's selection as permanent director of music was announced. He then proceeded to re-audition the entire Cathedral Choir to raise the level of expertise, dismissing those whose voices or sight-reading aptitude he deemed unsatisfactory, paring the choir from 120 choristers to 76 by the end of the year.

During his seven years there, the landmark cathedral's music program expanded significantly, as Caprio started three choral ensembles for special performances, such as the 16-voice "Cathedral Schola" for a revived series of afternoon vesper services and the "Chapel Singers", an all-professional group of singers capable of expert sight-reading, in addition to the main 80-voice Cathedral Choir singing for principal liturgical services as well as special concerts performed with orchestral accompaniment. In addition to the Cathedral Choir's mostly volunteer singers, Caprio augmented the group by increasing the number of trained, professional singers from four to twelve, many of whom had experience in opera.

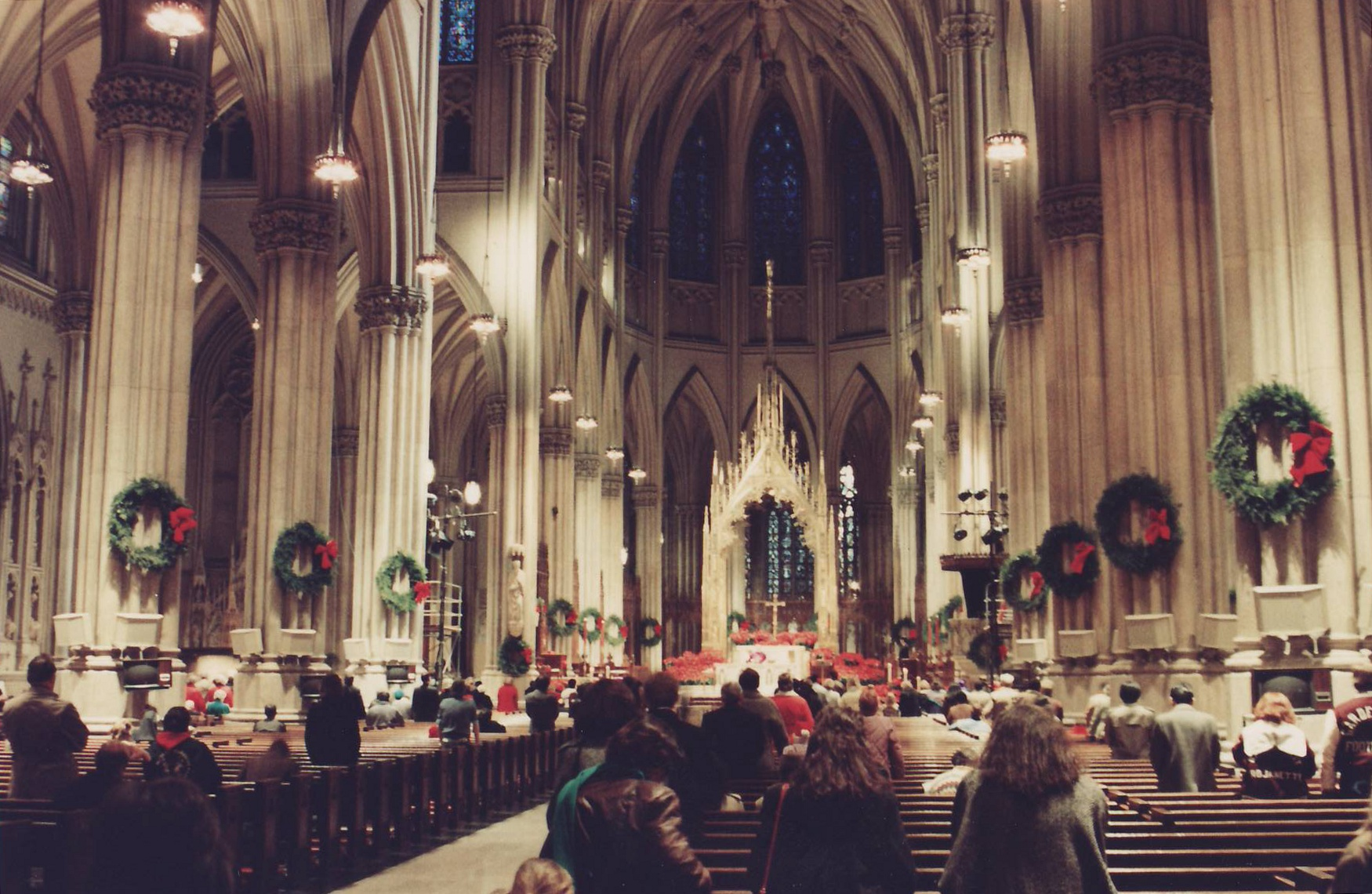
St. Patrick's Cathedral on Christmas Eve

The cathedral's music program for the 1992 Christmas season was typical for Caprio: Gaston Dethier's Variations on "Adeste Fidelis", John Rutter's Star Carol, Nativity Carol, and Shepherd's Pipe Carol, Harold Darke's In the Bleak Midwinter, Handel's "For Unto Us a Child Is Born" from Messiah, O Holy Night sung by soprano soloist Aprile Millo, and Gregorian chants. Although a performance of J. S. Bach's Magnificat was advertised in the New York Times, Caprio cancelled it upon being dissatisfied with the choir's rehearsal, exclaiming to the choir, "I'm not going to put something in front of the public that you can't perform properly!"

Because of Vatican limitations promulgated in 1987 on Catholic churches charging admission for non-liturgical music concerts and the need for additional funding to underwrite the cathedral's expanded musical endeavors, Caprio started the "Friends of Music", whose contributions helped defray the expense of his ambitious musical program. Caprio's many innovations and changes at the cathedral extended to the sartorial: declaring the choir's blue robes looked "too Protestant", he ordered their vestments replaced. New magenta robes having large, stylized "SPC" monograms in gold were procured.

On March 2, 1996, the Cathedral Choir conducted by Caprio premiered Irish composer Patrick Cassidy's work, Famine Remembrance, in observance of the 150th anniversary of the Great Famine of Ireland. The narrator was Anjelica Huston. Stephen Tharp, whom Caprio had hired the previous year as one of the cathedral organists, was accompanist, along with a 40-piece orchestra. That Christmas, the Midnight Mass from St. Patrick's Cathedral was televised live in Ireland by RTÉ, the Irish television network. Because of the 5-hour time difference, the service was held twice: at 7:00 p.m. New York time for midnight viewing in Dublin, and then repeated at the customary midnight hour in New York for broadcast by anchor station WPIX and the syndicated network carrying the Mass in the U.S.

=== BBC Songs of Praise ===
In an unusual recognition for an American choir, the BBC’s Songs of Praise television program chose to feature music videotaped at St. Patrick's Cathedral in March 1994, having as its theme the Irish in New York. Caprio was largely responsible for organizing the required musical forces, recruiting 2,600 singers for the "congregation", soloists such as Beth Clayton to sing the Battle Hymn of the Republic and Irish tenor Frank Patterson singing Here I Am, Lord, and orchestra with Caprio conducting throughout the production.

=== Organ restoration ===
The cathedral's Kilgen pipe organ, originally installed in 1930, underwent a multi-year restoration project beginning in 1993, while Caprio was music director. By the end of 1996, the $1.2 million project resulted in the replacement of the antiquated 3-manual console with a state-of-the-art 5-manual console capable of playing all divisions of the organ. The thousands of pipes dulled by age gleamed again. Reporting on the restoration's progress in an interview with Caprio, who discussed the remaining work to be done, the New York Times said, "When visitors enter St. Patrick's, the most famous Roman Catholic cathedral in the United States and a major tourist attraction, they gaze up into the organ lofts and are dazzled by what they see ... .".

=== Papal visit ===
In October 1995, Pope John Paul II visited the United States, attracting an estimated crowd of 125,000 for an open-air rally at New York City's Central Park on October 5. Caprio was responsible for selecting the music and marshalling forces to participate in the event, as well as serving as conductor for the 225-voice Festival Choir drawn from several New York area churches. He also had to coordinate all of the soloists, such as Roberta Flack, Natalie Cole, and Plácido Domingo. Reporting on the auspicious event, the New York Times said of the music, "It swelled over the park and out into the city in great sweet gales". Caprio had composer Bruce Saylor commissioned to provide two pieces for the Pope's visit: Hymn to Joy Fantasy was sung at the outdoor Mass and In Praise of Jerusalem, a setting of Psalm 122, was used at the following Papal service in St. Patrick's Cathedral. In asking Saylor to compose the work, Caprio told him, "I'd like to throw brass ensembles all over St. Patrick". The result was a majestic work sung by a choir of 250, joined by three brass ensembles, timpani, organ, and percussion accompanying the Pope's promenade down the length of the cathedral's nave. At the Pontiff's request, he met Caprio afterwards in Cardinal O'Connor's residence to express his congratulations.

== Discography ==
Three compact disc recordings were produced by the St. Patrick's Cathedral choir while Caprio was director of music and Donald Dumler was principal organist:

- O Come, Let us Sing unto the Lord (1997) — The Choir of St. Patrick's Cathedral, Donald Dumler, organist, and John-Michael Caprio, conductor
- The Great Organ of St. Patrick's Cathedral (1996) — Donald Dumler, organist
- Famine Remembrance (1997) — The Choir of St. Patrick's Cathedral, John-Michael Caprio, conductor

== Death and legacy ==
"God gave us the gift of music, and making music in His house is an appropriate thing to do"

— John-Michael Caprio, Hartford Courant (December 14, 1997)

In July 1997, Caprio was diagnosed with stage IV colon cancer. After undergoing surgery at Lenox Hill Hospital followed by chemotherapy, he returned to his duties at St. Patrick's Cathedral and resumed directing the choir. By December, however, Caprio was greatly debilitated and struggled to conduct the choir at an evening concert on Thursday, December 11. That would be his final appearance at the conductor's podium: the following Sunday, Caprio was unable to lead the choir for Morning Mass. Soon thereafter, Caprio suffered a stroke which rendered him completely incapacitated, unable even to speak. He died early on Christmas morning, December 25, 1997, less than two hours after the conclusion of St. Patrick's nationally televised Christmas Eve Midnight Mass. Caprio had planned and rehearsed the music, and his name appeared in the printed program as music director for the final time. At his funeral, held at St. Patrick's, Cardinal O'Connor eulogized him and reflected, "John-Michael Caprio will be leading the choir of angels".

The Riverside Symphonia founded by Caprio in 1990 continues to the present day as a professional orchestra performing major works. In addition, the Symphonia holds the "Caprio Young Artists Competition" annually in its founder's memory, awarding cash prizes to aspiring young musicians in the New Jersey, New York, and Pennsylvania area for advanced studies in music. Composer Bruce Saylor named one of his tunes "Caprio", in honor of its namesake.

In its retrospective on Caprio's impact, St. Patrick's Cathedral paid tribute to his vision of excellence in sacred music, saying:

"Not since the days of the legendary Pietro Yon had St. Patrick’s enjoyed such a variety of musical events."

| Preceded by John Grady | Director of Music, St. Patrick's Cathedral; 1990–1997 | Succeeded by John C. West |
