= Charles Matthews =

Charles Matthews or Mathews may refer to:

- Charles Mathews (1776–1835), English theatre manager and actor
- Charles James Mathews (1803–1878), English actor, son of the above
- Charles Edward Mathews (1834–1905), English mountaineer
- Sir Charles Willie Mathews (1850–1920), English barrister and Director of Public Prosecutions, stepson of Charles James Mathews
- Charles Elkin Mathews (1851–1921), British publisher and bookseller
- Charles Matthews (Pennsylvania politician) (1856–1932), member of the U.S. House of Representatives from Pennsylvania
- Charles Matthews (baseball) (1863–1926), American baseball player
- Charles Thompson Mathews (1863–1934), American architect, author and philanthropist
- Race Mathews (Charles Race Thorson Mathews, 1935–2025), Australian politician
- Charles Matthews (Texas politician) (born 1939), former member of the Texas Railroad Commission
- Charles Matthews (Whitewater), Whitewater controversy defendant
- Charles Matthews (writer), one of the authors of How Wikipedia Works
- Charles Matthews (basketball) (born 1996), American basketball player
