= Jennifer Pascual =

American organist

- Born: 1971 (age 54–55)

Academic background
- Education: Jacksonville University (BM); The New School (MM); University of Rochester (DMA)

Academic work
- Discipline: Music
- Sub-discipline: Organ repertoire

Jennifer Pascual, DSG (born 1971) is an American organist and conductor. Since 2003, she has been the director of music at St. Patrick's Cathedral in New York City.

== Education ==
Pascual earned a Bachelor of Music in piano and organ performance and music education from Jacksonville University, Master of Music in piano performance from the Mannes School of Music at The New School, and a Doctor of Musical Arts in organ performance from the Eastman School of Music at the University of Rochester.

== Career ==
On February 13, 2002 Pascual was named associate director of music at the Cathedral Basilica of the Sacred Heart in Newark, New Jersey.

On September 1, 2003 she was named director of music at St. Patrick Cathedral in New York City by Eugene V. Clark, rector of St. Patrick Cathedral, and Edward Cardinal Egan, Archbishop of New York.

Pascual was charged with overseeing all of the music for the Pastoral Visit to New York by Pope Benedict XVI on his April 2008 Apostolic Journey to the United States. During the visit, she conducted the music for the Ecumenical Prayer Service at St. Joseph's Church, Yorkville (Manhattan), Mass at St. Patrick Cathedral, and Mass at Yankee Stadium.

She was also in charge of liturgical music for the Pastoral Visit to New York by Pope Francis during his September 2015 Apostolic Journey to the United States, conducting the music for Evening Prayer (Vespers) at St. Patrick Cathedral and Mass at Madison Square Garden.

== Honors ==
She was named a Dame of St. Gregory the Great by Pope Benedict XVI in December 2008 for distinguished service to the Roman Catholic Church.

== Discography ==
- Organ Music & Gregorian Chant
- Christmas Carols for Organ and Trumpet
- Joyful, Joyful We Adore Thee (choir)

Preceded by Johannes Somary	Director of Music and Organist, St. Patrick Cathedral, New York City; 2003-present	Succeeded by incumbent
Preceded by Pablo Fernandez	Associate Director of Music, Cathedral Basilica of the Sacred Heart, Newark, NJ; 2002-2003	Succeeded by Mark Pacoe
