= What's So Funny About Peace, Love, and Understanding =

2025 mural by Adam Cvijanovic

What's So Funny About Peace, Love, and Understanding is a twelve-panel mural created by Adam Cvijanovic (b. 1960) in the narthex of St. Patrick's Cathedral on Fifth Avenue in Midtown Manhattan, New York City. It is the first major addition to the cathedral in 75 years and a celebration of immigrants. The title of the work is borrowed from the Nick Lowe song famously covered by Elvis Costello of almost the same name, (What's So Funny 'Bout) Peace, Love, and Understanding. The Archbishop of New York, Cardinal Timothy Dolan, unveiled the mural in the cathedral on September 17, 2025.

The mural is 25 feet (7.6 m) high and stretches across 1,920 square feet (178 m^{2}). The visual passage at the nexus of the work is centered on the Apparition at Knock in Knock, Ireland in 1879, which is commemorated today by the Knock Shrine.

Among the notable immigrants to the United States depicted in the mural are the Haitian born hairdresser and Catholic philanthropist Pierre Toussaint, the Irish born Archbishop of New York and founder of what would go on to become Fordham University John Hughes, and Mother Frances Cabrini, the patron saint of immigrants. Also depicted is Dorothy Day, co-founder of the Catholic Worker periodical, and Saint Kateri Tekakwitha (aka Lily of the Mohawks), the first Native American Saint.
