= St. Patrick's Cathedral (New York City) =

Catholic cathedral in Manhattan, New York

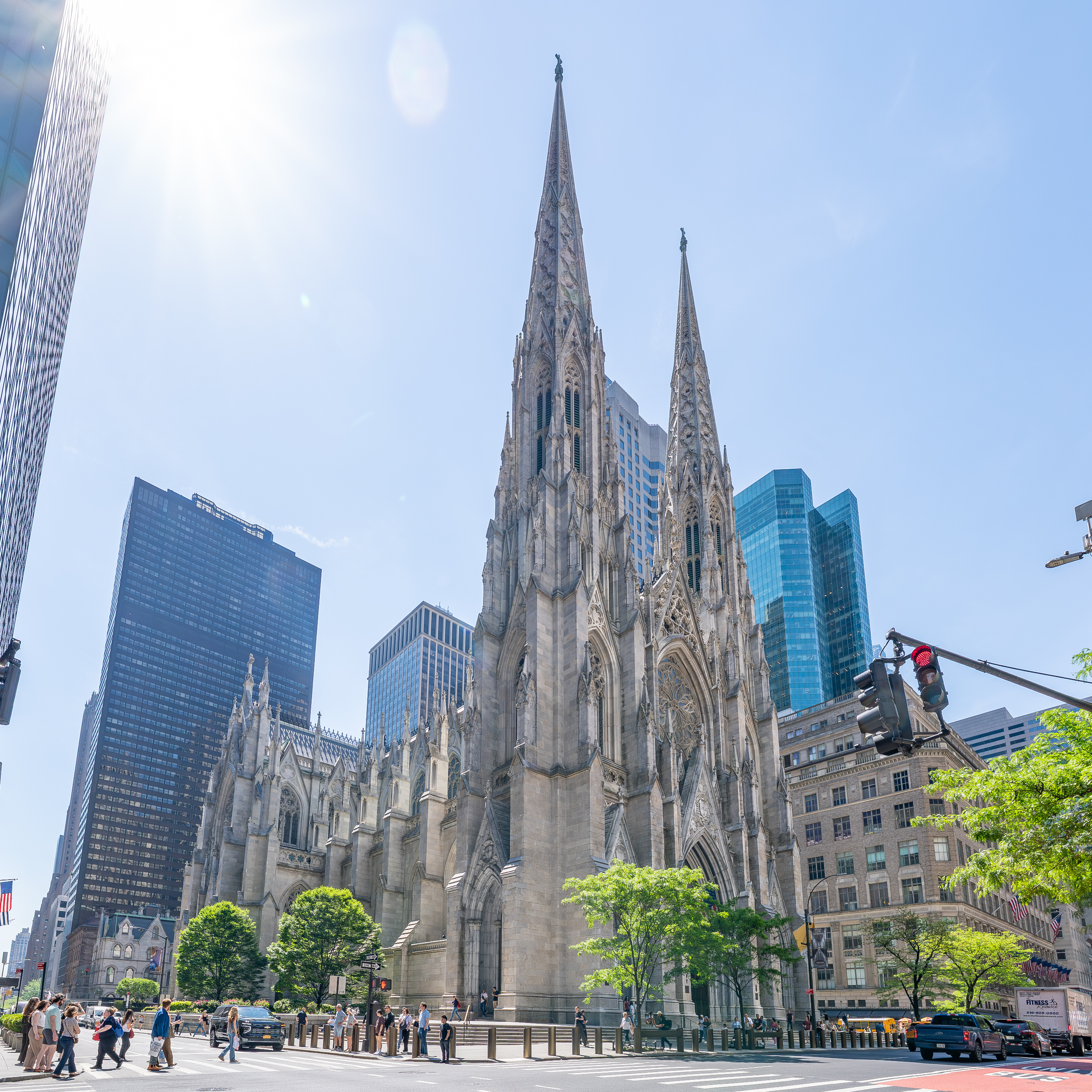
- View of the cathedral from the corner of Fifth Avenue & 51st Street (2026)
- St. Patrick's Cathedral
- Location: 631 Fifth Avenue, Manhattan, New York, U.S.
- Country: United States
- Denomination: Catholic Church
- Tradition: Latin Church
- Website: saintpatrickscathedral.org

History
- Status: Cathedral
- Dedication: Saint Patrick
- Dedicated: October 5, 1910
- Earlier dedication: May 25, 1879
- Consecrated: October 5, 1910

Architecture
- Functional status: Active
- Architect: James Renwick Jr.
- Architectural type: Church
- Style: Decorated neo-Gothic

Specifications
- Capacity: 2,400
- Length: 396.7 feet (120.9 m)
- Materials: Tuckahoe marble

Administration
- Archdiocese: New York
- Deanery: South Manhattan

Clergy
- Archbishop: Ronald Hicks
- Rector: Enrique Salvo
- St. Patrick's Cathedral Complex
- U.S. National Register of Historic Places
- U.S. National Historic Landmark
- New York State Register of Historic Places
- New York City Landmark
- Coordinates: 40°45′31″N 73°58′35″W
- Area: 2 acres (0.81 ha)
- Built: 1878
- NRHP reference No.: 76001250
- NYSRHP No.: 06101.000367
- NYCL No.: 0267

Significant dates
- Added to NRHP: December 8, 1976
- Designated NHL: December 8, 1976
- Designated NYSRHP: June 23, 1980
- Designated NYCL: October 19, 1966

St. Patrick's Cathedral is a Catholic cathedral in the Midtown Manhattan neighborhood of New York City, United States. It is the seat of the Archbishop of New York as well as a parish church. The cathedral occupies a city block bounded by Fifth Avenue, Madison Avenue, 50th Street, and 51st Street, directly across from Rockefeller Center. Designed by James Renwick Jr., it is the largest Gothic Revival Catholic cathedral in North America.

The cathedral was constructed starting in 1858 to accommodate the growing Archdiocese of New York and to replace St. Patrick's Old Cathedral. After a pause in the early 1860s during the American Civil War, the cathedral was completed in 1878 and dedicated on May 25, 1879. The archbishop's house and rectory were added in the early 1880s, both designed by James Renwick Jr., and the spires were added in 1888. A Lady chapel designed by Charles T. Mathews was constructed from 1901 to 1906. The cathedral was consecrated on October 5, 1910, after all its debt had been paid off. Extensive restorations of the cathedral were conducted several times, including in the 1940s, 1970s, and 2010s.

St. Patrick's Cathedral is clad in marble and has several dozen stained glass windows. It measures 332 feet (101 m) long, with a maximum width of 174 feet (53 m) at the transepts. The bronze doors that form the cathedral's main entrance on Fifth Avenue are flanked by towers with spires rising 329.5 feet (100 m). The northern tower contains nineteen bells, and the interior has two pipe organs. Inside is a nave flanked by several chapels; two transepts; a chancel and apse; and a crypt. East of the apse are the rectory, Lady chapel, and archbishop's residence facing Madison Avenue. The cathedral is a New York City designated landmark and is listed on the National Register of Historic Places.

== History ==
The Diocese of New York was founded by Pope Pius VII in 1808. St. Patrick's was founded shortly afterward to serve New York City's small, but growing, Catholic population, which could no longer fit in St. Peter's Church. A site was selected on Mulberry Street in what is now Lower Manhattan, and St. Patrick's Old Cathedral was dedicated in 1815. At the time, there were 15,000 Catholics in the diocese.

=== Early site history ===
In March 1810, the Rev. Father Anthony Kohlmann bought the land on which the present cathedral stands. The site was bounded by what is now Fifth Avenue on the west, 51st Street on the north, Madison Avenue to the east, and 50th Street on the south. The Jesuit community built a college on the site, which at the time was north of New York City proper. It contained a "fine old house" which was fitted with a chapel of St. Ignatius. In 1813, the Jesuits sold the lot to the Diocese of New York. The school closed in 1814 and the diocese gave the property to Dom Augustin LeStrange, the abbot of a community of Trappists who were fleeing persecution by French authorities. In addition to a small monastic community, they looked after orphans. With the downfall of Napoleon, the Trappists returned to France in 1815, but the neighboring orphanage was maintained by the diocese into the late nineteenth century.

In 1828, trustees of St. Patrick's, St. Peter's, and St. Mary's met to discuss the feasibility of establishing a burial ground at Fifth Avenue between 50th and 51st Streets. The trustees bought the property in 1829 but did not use it as a cemetery. Bishop John Dubois reopened the chapel in 1840 for Catholics employed at the Deaf and Dumb Asylum and in the general neighborhood. A modest frame church was built for the parish of St. John the Evangelist and dedicated in 1841 by the Rev. John Hughes, administrator of the diocese. Tickets were sold to the dedication to ease the parish's debt, but the mortgage was foreclosed upon, and in 1844 the church was sold at auction. The church's pastor, the Rev. Felix Larkin, was said to have died from stress as a result. The Rev. Michael A. Curran was appointed to raise funds for the devastated parish and used an old college hall as a temporary church. Curran continued raising funds to buy back the church during the Great Famine in Ireland, eventually succeeding and taking the deed in his own name.

=== Planning ===
By the early 1840s, the number of Catholics in the Diocese of New York had increased to 200,000. As a result, several additional dioceses were created in New York state. Most of New York state's Catholics at the time were Irish. The Diocese of New York was made an archdiocese by Pope Pius IX on July 19, 1850. Bishop John Joseph Hughes was raised to the level of archbishop soon afterward. As early as 1850, Hughes determined that the growing Archdiocese of New York needed a large cathedral to replace the older cathedral in Lower Manhattan. At the time, the Fifth Avenue site was still relatively rural. The site faced the gardens of Columbia University to the west, but the surrounding area was otherwise characterized by rocks and unopened streets. Even so, Hughes believed the site would grow into a populous business area.

In 1853, Hughes announced that he had hired the firm Renwick & Rodrigue to design a cathedral on Fifth Avenue between 50th and 51st Streets. One partner in the firm, William Rodrigue, was Hughes's brother-in-law. The other partner, James Renwick Jr., was largely responsible for designing the new St. Patrick's Cathedral. Renwick spent three years in Europe to look for design influences for New York City's new Catholic cathedral. He took particular inspiration from the unfinished Cologne Cathedral. Renwick & Rodrigue originally planned a larger cathedral than the structure that was ultimately built. Hughes requested in 1857 that the firm reduce the dimensions of the new cathedral. To make way for the clergy's and archbishop's residences, the ambulatory was removed from the plans. The area behind the apse would have contained a chapel dedicated to the Blessed Virgin, but this was removed entirely. The numerous heavy buttresses in the design were also removed.

Plans for the cathedral were finalized in 1858. To raise money for the effort, Hughes asked wealthy Catholics in the Archdiocese of New York to subscribe to a building fund for the new cathedral. One hundred and three subscribers donated $1,000 apiece, and two subscribers were non-Catholics. The first construction contracts for the new Fifth Avenue cathedral were issued in June 1858. The new St. Patrick's Cathedral was to take up the entire block bounded by Fifth and Madison Avenues between 50th and 51st Streets. The front facade on Fifth Avenue would have three large entrances, and the northwest and southwest corners of the cathedral would be topped by an octagonal spire. The interior was to be designed in a cruciform layout. The cathedral was to be built in the Gothic Revival style. In addition, an archbishop's house and a chapel would face Madison Avenue. At the time, there were numerous hospitals, asylums, and other public institutions along the nearby section of Fifth Avenue.

=== Construction ===
==== Initial work and hiatus ====
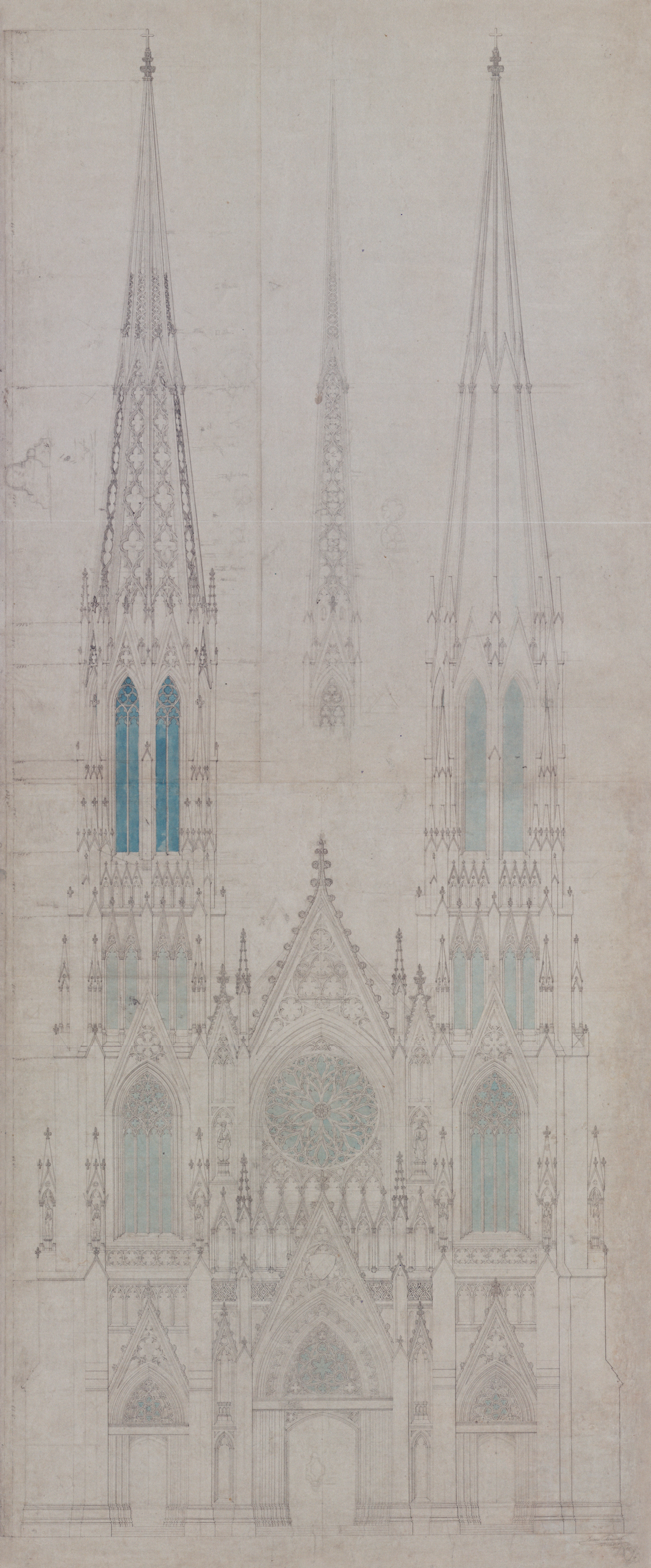
Exterior elevation drawing of the western facade, by James Renwick, architect

On August 15, 1858, the cornerstone was laid just south of the diocese's orphanage. Archbishop Hughes laid the cornerstone in front of 100,000 spectators near the intersection of Fifth Avenue and 50th Street, though the precise location remains unclear. That October, the architects presented cost estimates for making the cathedral out of white marble, brown freestone, olive freestone, or granite. The white marble was the most expensive of the four options, with a projected cost of $850,000, and James Hall and William Joyce offered to supply the marble. (Note: Albert stone would have cost $800,000, Belleville stone would have cost $805,000, and Dorchester stone would have cost $830,000.) Even so, Renwick recommended that St. Patrick's be constructed of white marble, citing its durability and beauty. The archdiocese formed a Bureau of Contracts, which first met in December 1858.

The bureau awarded the marble contract to Hall and Joyce in March 1859; at the time, the work was supposed to be finished before January 1, 1867. The cost estimate of $867,500 for the entire cathedral (equivalent to $25,087,478 in 2025) was unusually low for a project of that size. Construction progressed for two years after the cornerstone was laid. The work consisted of laying stone blocks for the foundation, each weighing between one and four tons. The foundation was excavated to a maximum depth of 20 feet (6.1 m), where it was laid on solid rock. The excavations were relatively small because the underlying layer of bedrock was shallow, rising nearly to the surface near the transept on Fifth Avenue. White-marble walls were then constructed above the foundation. By January 1860, the cathedral had been erected to about 7 feet (2.1 m) above ground level. Work was slightly delayed by a stonecutters' strike that March.

The walls had reached the water table when all $73,000 in funds had been exhausted. As a result, in August 1860, Hughes decided to suspend all work on the new cathedral. When work was suspended, the walls had been built to an average height of 12 feet (3.7 m) above ground. The onset of the American Civil War in 1861 prevented the resumption of work for several years. Hughes died in January 1864 before the work could resume. John McCloskey was appointed to succeed Hughes as archbishop. McCloskey created a plan to finance the construction of the new St. Patrick's Cathedral.

==== Completion ====
By mid-1866, work had again resumed and the walls had been built to 20 feet (6.1 m) above ground. The Brooklyn Daily Eagle reported that the interior "looks like a large field" and said the cathedral would be "worthy to be regarded as one of the wonders of the Republic". Some $100,000 was spent on the Catholic cathedral in 1867, and the constituent churches of the Archdiocese of New York promised to spend $100,000 a year until the cathedral was complete. Most funding for the cathedral came from the parishioners of these churches, who were mainly poor Irish immigrants. An editorial in the New York World described the cathedral as being constructed "not of the superfluity of wealth, but for the most part out of the offerings of poverty".

The cathedral's masonry was laid during summer as the stonework could not be laid in the cold. By late 1870, the marble walls had been built to a height of 54 feet (16 m) and the transept was finished. The entrance on Fifth Avenue, measuring 70 feet (21 m) tall, had also been finished. Over a hundred workers were busy quarrying marble from Pleasantville, north of New York City. The marble was transported down to New York City via the Harlem Railroad, where a branch track led to the new cathedral's site. The construction of the new cathedral drew relatively little interest for New York City's non-Catholic population, though several commentators praised the cathedral's design. An anonymous author for the Real Estate Record and Guide wrote that the new St. Patrick's Cathedral was the "most gorgeous ecclesiastical edifice on this continent", though the critics perceived the buttresses on the north and south sides of the facade as "altogether unnecessary". A reporter for the New York World, probably Montgomery Schuyler, wrote in 1871 that the cathedral would be "one of the leading ecclesiastical structures in the world".

The trustees of St. Patrick's Cathedral borrowed $300,000 from the Emigrant Industrial Savings Bank for the new cathedral in 1874. The trustees gave the bank a first mortgage on the cathedral and site as collateral for the loan. By late 1875, the roof had been covered with slate and all of the walls were finished, except for a small portion along Fifth Avenue. The trustees borrowed another $100,000 from the Emigrant Bank in 1876. Late that year, temporary scaffolding was erected so the interior could be plastered and decorated. Almost all the stained glass had been delivered and was being glazed; four of these windows had been exhibited at the Centennial Exposition. Only one worker had been killed during the construction process, according to the American Architect and Building News, due to his own carelessness. McCloskey made contracts for furnishings in 1874 and again in 1878.

On November 29, 1877, the incomplete St. Patrick's Cathedral was opened for public viewing. A one-month-long fundraiser for the cathedral commenced on October 22, 1878. In its first three weeks, the fundraiser had an average daily attendance of between ten and eleven thousand. The fair ran for 36 nights and attracted about 250,000 total visitors when it closed on November 30. Forty-five parishes of the Archdiocese of New York had exhibits at the fair. The fundraiser sought to raise $200,000 for the cathedral, but it ultimately netted $173,000. Several months elapsed before the cathedral was readied for its dedication in early 1879.

=== Opening and late 19th century ===
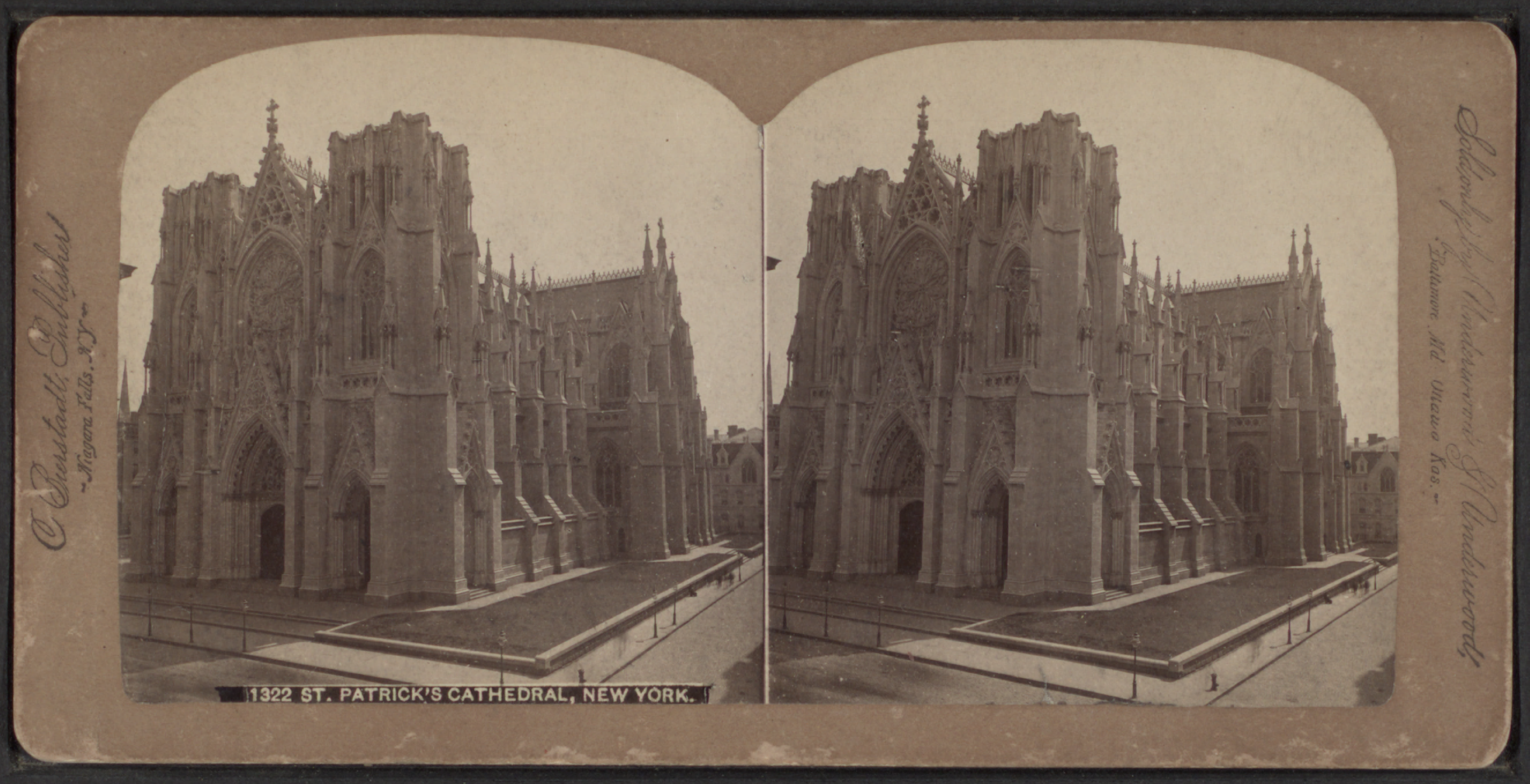
Stereoscopic view of the cathedral's appearance prior to the installation of spires

The new St. Patrick's Cathedral opened on May 25, 1879. Thirty-five bishops and six archbishops attended the dedication. St. Patrick's was met with a generally positive reception from the media. The Baltimore Sun, for example, called it the "finest church edifice on the American continent". Not all critics spoke of the cathedral positively; journalist Clarence Cook authored a criticism that architectural historian Robert A. M. Stern characterized as being "underpinned with religious and ethnic bigotry". Cook perceived the facade as being full of "clumsy repetition", and he wrote of the interior: "Words cannot express the paltry character of the internal finish of this vaunted structure." The new St. Patrick's Cathedral and Temple Emanu-El comprised the first non-Protestant houses of worship on the midtown section of Fifth Avenue. At the time, the cathedral was far removed from the developed portions of the city. The first bishop consecrated in the new cathedral was the Michael J. O'Farrell of Trenton, New Jersey, who became the first bishop of the Diocese of Trenton.

The cathedral's parish originally extended from Seventh Avenue to the East River between 46th and 59th Streets, and the section between Madison and Sixth Avenues extended to 42nd Street. In 1880, the section between Third Avenue and the East River was split to the parish of St. John the Evangelist. During the early 1880s, Renwick designed the archbishop's house and rectory on Madison Avenue. The Real Estate Record and Guide reported in December 1881 that Renwick had been hired to build a rectory at the southwest corner of Madison Avenue and 51st Street. Shortly afterward, Renwick filed plans for a four-story marble rectory on the site, to be built by E. D. Connoly & Son and P. Walsh. The archbishop's house was completed the same year. The rectory was completed on May 8, 1884. A critic for the Real Estate Record characterized the rectory and archbishop's house as having "absurd" dormer windows in their mansard roofs. A memorial marble pulpit was manufactured in Italy and installed in the cathedral in October 1885. The money for the pulpit came from the clergy of the archdiocese, who had offered Cardinal McCloskey $10,000 for his golden jubilee and commissioned the pulpit after he had declined the prize.

A lack of funding precluded spires from being installed when the cathedral was completed. By late 1885, spires were planned to be installed at a cost of $190,000. Renwick filed plans for the cathedral spires in September 1885, and the contract was awarded to George Mann & Co. of Baltimore. Excavation of the stone commenced in January 1886 and the spires were constructed starting that September. The last stones of the spires were erected in October 1888, at which point the cathedral was considered completed. At the time several hundred niches remained to be filled with figures, and ten chapels did not have their altars yet. At 329.5 feet (100.4 m), (Note: A less precise measurement of 330 feet (100 m) is given by several sources.) the spires were the tallest structures in New York City. The Evening World said the construction of the spires "completes a notable ornament to the city". Within a year, the cathedral was surpassed in height by the New York World Building, whose spire rose to 349 feet (106 m). The funding shortages at the building's completion had also required that a "temporary" plaster and wood ceiling be installed atop the cathedral, rather than the marble or brick ceiling that Renwick had conceived. The cathedral never replaced the plaster-and-wood ceiling.

After the spires were finished, the trustees of St. Patrick's Cathedral decided that bells should be installed in one tower. No arrangements had yet been made for the bells because parts of the project, such as interior design, remained incomplete. The cathedral tested a set of four bells in the north tower in July and August 1889 to determine the tower's acoustic properties. The altar of the Holy Family was consecrated at the cathedral in 1893. A set of bells for the cathedral was manufactured in the United States. After the archbishop consecrated them, the bells were found to be defective and were never hung in the belfry. In 1895, the cathedral ordered a second set of bells to be made by the Paccards in France. The new bells were blessed by Archbishop Michael Corrigan on August 15, 1897, though they had not been installed yet. The framework for the bells was installed in the north tower the next month. At the time of completion, St. Patrick's had more bells than any other church in the city, with 19; by comparison, Trinity Church had ten bells and Grace Church had nine. Also in 1897, the Spiritual Sons of De La Salle funded a new altar for the cathedral.

=== 20th century ===
==== Lady chapel and consecration ====
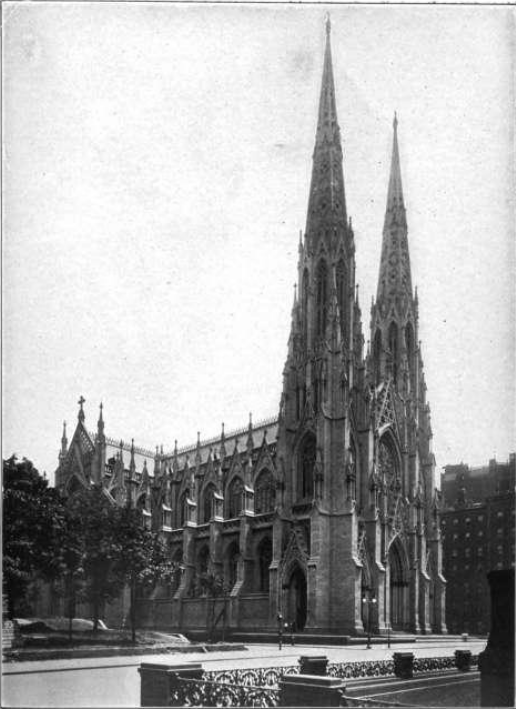
1913 photograph of the cathedral

Margaret A. Kelly, widow of banker Eugene Kelly, died in 1899 and left $200,000 to the cathedral for the construction of a Lady chapel, on the condition that the chapel not be constructed until after her death. Kelly's sons pledged additional funds for the chapel as necessary. The next year, the trustees of St. Patrick's Cathedral held an architectural design competition for the chapel, east of the cathedral's apse. The trustees received submissions from American, Canadian, French, and British architects before giving the commission to Charles T. Mathews of New York City. After traveling to Europe to study architectural influences, Mathews prepared plans for the chapel by September 1900. Work on the Lady chapel began in July 1901.

Archbishop Corrigan was simultaneously paying off the debt on the cathedral with the intention of consecrating it after all the debts were paid off in 1908. This date was the centennial of the Archdiocese of New York's founding and the 50-year anniversary of the groundbreaking ceremony. However, he died in 1902 before the consecration or the retirement of the debt. Following a construction delay of more than one year, the Lady chapel was nearly complete by early 1905. The first Mass in the Lady chapel took place in Christmas 1906, but the interior furnishings were not complete until 1908. The chapel cost $800,000 in total.

Additional changes to the cathedral took place in the first decade of the 20th century. These included the construction of an altar to St. Michael on the left side of the Lady chapel, as well as an altar to St. Joseph on the right side. By 1907, a movable bronze screen was to be installed at the transept, and the temporary wooden floor dating from the cathedral's construction was planned to be replaced with a permanent marble floor. The bronze screens were a gift to celebrate the archdiocese's centennial, which almost every archbishop in the United States celebrated at the cathedral in April 1908. The Lady chapel was originally outfitted with transparent windows, though its stained-glass windows were manufactured in Europe starting in 1909. In the first half of 1910, the cathedral's debt of $800,000 was completely paid off. St. Patrick's Cathedral was consecrated on October 5, 1910, with Archbishop John Murphy Farley officiating. By that time, the surrounding area was quickly being developed.

==== 1920s through 1940s ====
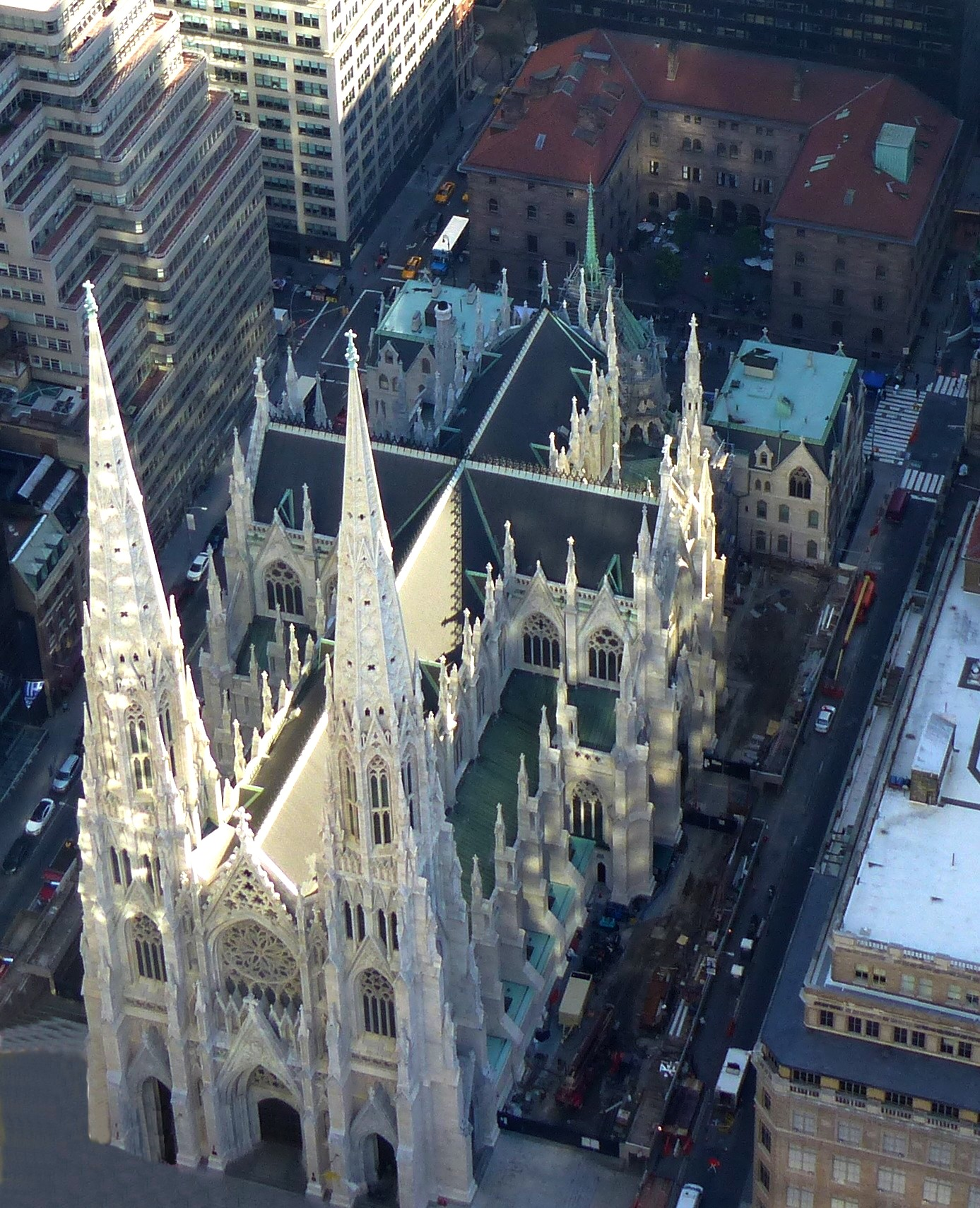
View from Rockefeller Center

Monsignor Michael J. Lavelle started raising $625,000 from the congregation in 1926 to renovate the cathedral. The next year, Robert J. Reiley was hired to conduct renovations, including replacing the wooden floor with a marble floor. The floor was replaced between April and December 1927. The old organ was also replaced and new stained-glass windows, altar, and pews were being installed in the Lady chapel. The sanctuary was extended approximately 8 feet (2.4 m), the metal communion rail was replaced with a bronze and marble rail, and the wooden throne was replaced with one of marble. Amplifiers, wrought-iron doors, and new bronze chandeliers were installed. New pews were also installed, as were two new organs. English stained glass artist and designer Paul Vincent Woodroffe completed the Lady chapel's remaining windows by late 1930. With the construction of Rockefeller Center to the west, several trees were planted around the cathedral in 1939 to complement Rockefeller Center's trees.

The cathedral's rectory was closed in April 1940 for the first major renovation in its history, and it reopened that December. Archbishop Francis Spellman announced in February 1941 that an anonymous donor had provided funding for a new high altar, to be designed by Charles Maginnis. According to Spellman's announcement, the original high altar had been "architecturally inconsistent" with the cathedral's design ever since the Lady chapel was completed, but a lack of funds had prevented the altar's replacement for four decades. The reredos behind the original high altar blocked the view of the Lady chapel from the nave, but the cathedral's trustees wished to avoid this. The old main altar was removed in February 1942 and the new main altar of St. Patrick's Cathedral was consecrated that May. A new altar in the Lady chapel, donated by George J. Gillespie, was also consecrated in May 1942.

The George A. Fuller Company started renovating the exterior in August 1945 after blasting for a nearby building dislodged a stone from the facade. The main doorway was narrowed, and some of the projecting Gothic ornamentation was eliminated because they were prone to cracks in New York City's climate, which was characterized by abrupt temperature decreases. A bronze cross was placed atop the north tower, replacing the original stone cross there. The project involved 350 workers at its peak. Some funds for the renovation came from a 1946 bequest of $100,000 from radio personality Major Bowes. By early 1947, the project was completed except for the Lady Chapel and a set of new entrance doors. An anonymous donor gave the cathedral a $25,000 window, which was designed by Charles J. Connick Associates and unveiled in April 1947. Work began on an interior renovation in mid-1948, with 17 of the cathedral's 19 altars being replaced. Cardinal Francis Spellman blessed the new bronze doors in December 1949.

==== 1950s to 1990s ====
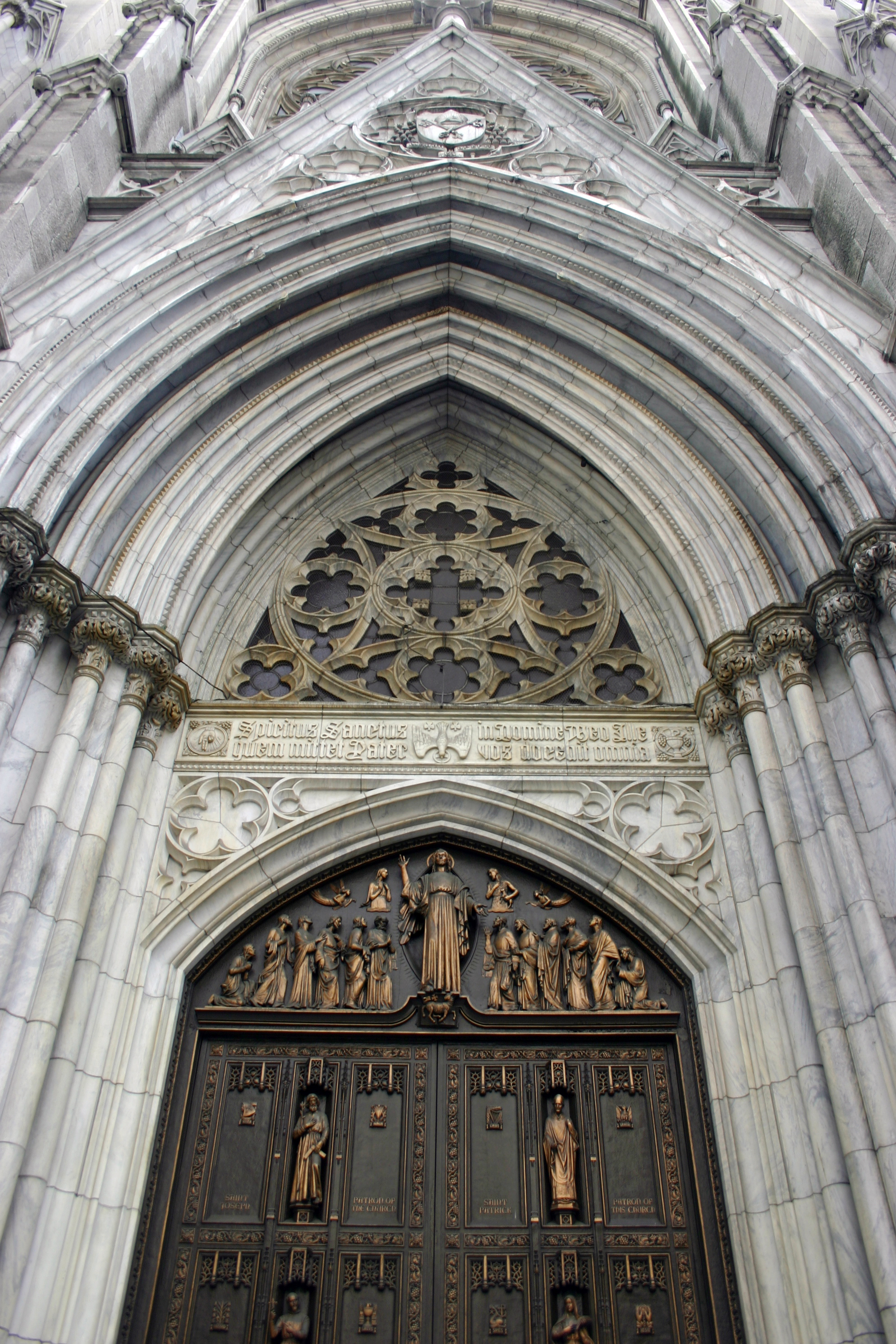
Detail of the entrance

In 1952, St. Patrick's Cathedral received five gifts. These funded the electrification of the cathedral chimes; an elevator to the main organ; kneeling cushions and guard cords in the pews; and new stained-glass windows. The windows, depicting 12 male and 12 female saints, were installed at the clerestory in 1954. These windows were funded by a bequest by Atlas Portland Cement Company president John R. Morron, who left $200,000 for the archdiocese in his will. The cathedral celebrated the 100th anniversary of its cornerstone-laying in 1958. At the time, the cathedral had over three million visitors a year. St. Patrick's celebrated the 50th anniversary of its consecration two years later.

The New York City Landmarks Preservation Commission (LPC) considered designating St. Patrick's Cathedral as a New York City landmark in early 1966. Later that year, the LPC designated the cathedral as a New York City Landmark. Under Cardinal Terence Cooke's leadership, the interior of St. Patrick's Cathedral was restored starting in 1972. That June, workers placed scaffolding on the cathedral to protect it from damage due to blasting for the construction of Olympic Tower across 51st Street. Afterward, over 100 workers cleaned and painted the interior while the cathedral remained open. The $800,000 project was completed in April 1973. The cathedral close, consisting of all structures on the same block as the cathedral, was listed on the National Register of Historic Places and declared a National Historic Landmark in 1976.

St. Patrick's Cathedral celebrated the centennial of its opening in May 1979. The cathedral's popularity was attributed to its location in midtown, and about 6,000 people attended Mass on Sundays, ninety percent of whom were visitors. The cathedral's exterior was cleaned the same year. Further restoration began in 1984 during the episcopate of Cardinal John O'Connor. As part of the work, most of the roof was replaced, and the entrance steps, doors, and walls were also repaired. The cathedral's two organs were restored in the mid-1990s.

=== 21st century ===
Under Cardinal Edward Egan, another renovation of the cathedral was planned in 2006 after chunks of rock started falling from the facade. The project was conducted between 2012 and 2015 at a cost of $177 million. The renovation was designed by Murphy Burnham & Buttrick and led by construction manager Structure Tone. The renovation involved cleaning the exterior marble, repairing stained-glass windows, painting the ceiling, and replacing the flooring and steps. In addition, the bronze doors were renovated and reinstalled. Work was completed by September 17, 2015, before Pope Francis visited the cathedral the next week. The scaffolding was removed in July 2016. The cathedral and the renovations were featured on WNET's television program Treasures of New York.

The LPC approved a garage on the 50th Street side of the cathedral in late 2015. The garage was designed to provide a secure entrance for Cardinal Timothy M. Dolan. In 2017, MBB Architects and Structure Tone, Landmark Facilities Group, and P.W. Grosser completed a new geothermal system under St. Patrick's Cathedral, believed to be the largest in New York City. The gardens adjoining the cathedral to the north and south were excavated for the system's construction, and they were replanted after installation was complete. The same October, a shrine to the Lebanese Maronite Saint Charbel Makhlouf was dedicated at St. Patrick's Cathedral. The cathedral was temporarily closed for in-person Mass in 2020 during the COVID-19 pandemic in New York City. The pandemic severely reduced the cathedral's finances as much of its income came from donations at Mass and the archdiocese did not fund the cathedral's maintenance. It was reopened for full-capacity worship in May 2021.

Following the rezoning of East Midtown in the late 2010s, the Archdiocese of New York began planning to sell the air rights attached to the cathedral's site. In December 2023, Citadel LLC and Vornado Realty Trust agreed to pay as much as $164 million for up to 525,000 square feet (48,800 m^{2}) of the cathedral's air rights, which would be transferred to a site at 350 Park Avenue. Also in 2023, Adam Cvijanovic won a competition to paint a mural at St. Patrick's. Cvijanovic's mural, What's So Funny About Peace, Love, and Understanding, was installed in 2025; it is the largest artwork ever installed at the cathedral, as well as the first since the bronze doors in 1949.

== Main structure ==
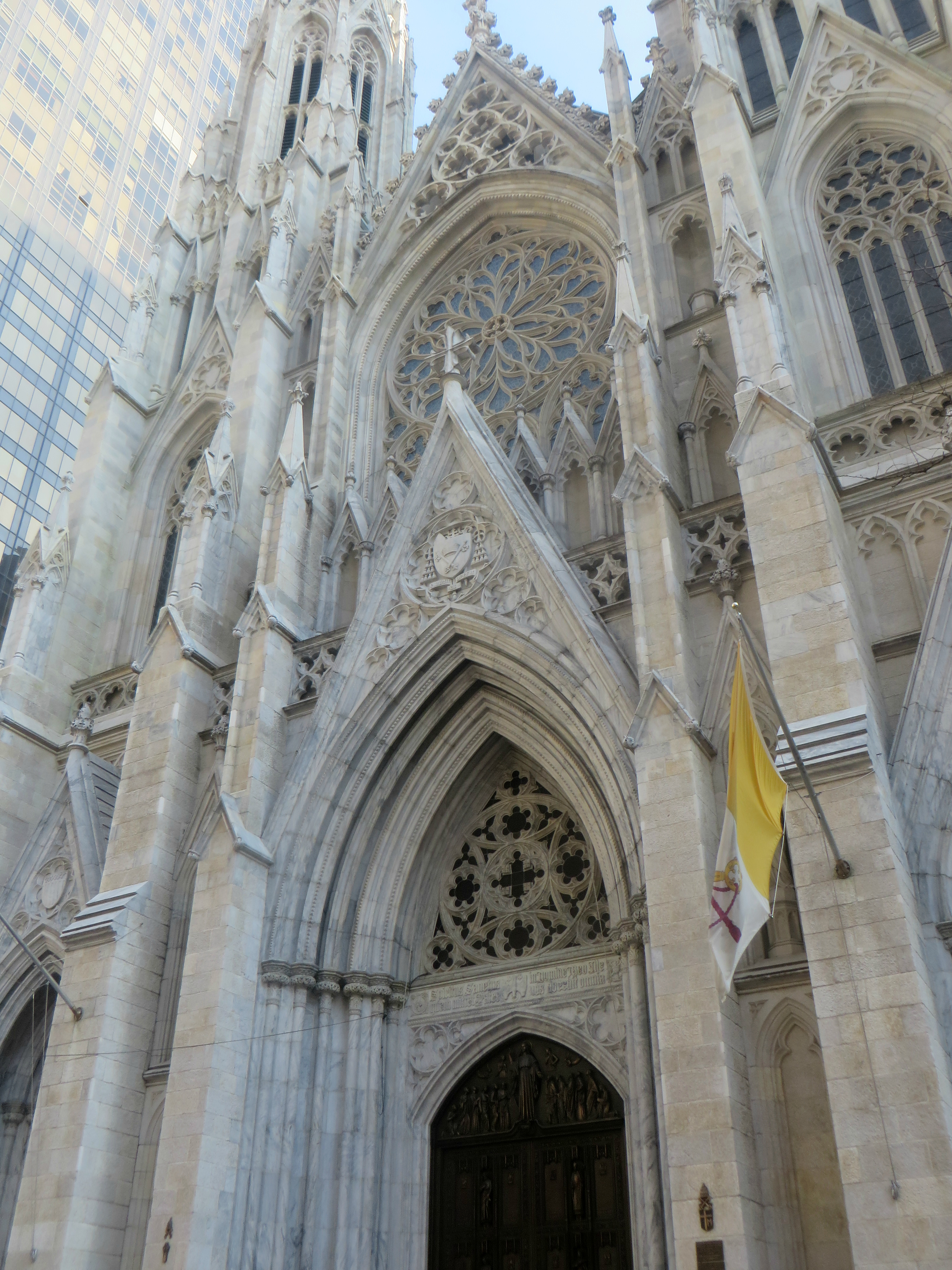
Main archway of the cathedral

St. Patrick's Cathedral was designed by James Renwick Jr. with influences from English, French, and German Gothic architecture. It is the largest Gothic Revival Catholic cathedral in North America, as well as the first major Gothic Revival cathedral in the United States. St. Patrick's Cathedral was described by CNN in 2020 as being an "essential part of New York City's architectural heritage". The cathedral serves as the seat for the Archdiocese of New York and as a parish church for the archdiocese within Manhattan. Prior to the COVID-19 pandemic, over five million people visited the cathedral each year. St. Patrick's Cathedral ranked 11th on the AIA's 2007 List of America's Favorite Architecture, which listed the top 150 buildings in the United States.

The foundation stones are made of blue gneiss granite set within cement mortar. The lowest horizontal course of the facade, as well as the lowest course under all the interior columns, is made of Dix Island granite from Maine. The exterior is clad in marble quarried in Lee, Massachusetts, and Pleasantville, New York. The main section of the cathedral is made of Tuckahoe marble. Behind the marble blocks are walls made of brick and stone laid in rough masonry, with hollow gaps for ventilation. The blocks were so closely laid that, decades after the cathedral's completion, no cracks had formed in them. The side walls are between 3 and 4 feet (0.91 and 1.22 m) thick, and the clerestory walls above the nave are 3 feet thick. Part of the interior is made of artificial Coignet stone. The marble for the spires was sourced from Cockeysville, Maryland, and the roof has 343 finials.

There are 103 windows on the cathedral in total. (Note: Some sources prior to the cathedral's expansion gave a figure of 70 windows.) The windows are glazed by two thicknesses of sash and glass, set 2 inches (51 mm) apart, to regulate interior temperatures and prevent air drafts. The exterior sashes are glazed with figured glass in lead sash, while the interior sashes are glazed with stained glass. The windows of the clerestory were made by Morgan Brothers. The cathedral had been constructed with 57 stained-glass windows: 37 representing scenes from Scripture and 20 representing geometrical shapes. Forty-five of the original windows were manufactured by Nicholas Lorin and Henry Ely in France. Other stained glass windows were added later. Renwick's original sketches show that the tracery near each window was designed with two grooves: one for stained glass and one for protective glazing.

=== Location and dimensions ===
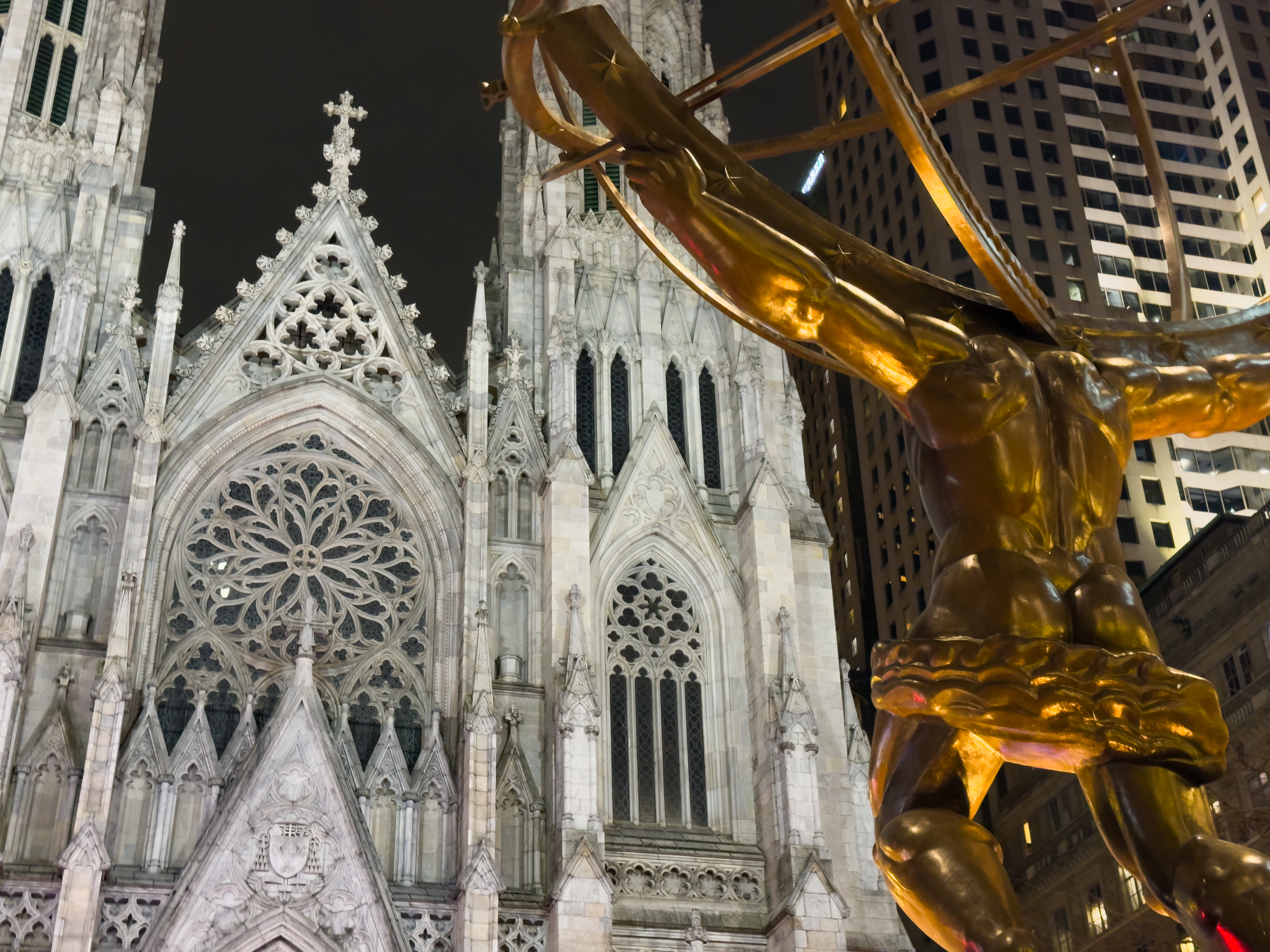
View of St. Patrick's Cathedral from the nearby Atlas statue at night

St. Patrick's Cathedral is in the Midtown Manhattan neighborhood of New York City. It takes up a full city block bounded by Fifth Avenue to the west, 51st Street to the north, Madison Avenue to the east, and 50th Street to the south. Clockwise from northwest, the cathedral is directly across from Olympic Tower, 11 East 51st Street, and 488 Madison Avenue to the north; the Villard Houses and Lotte New York Palace Hotel to the east; 18 East 50th Street and the Saks Fifth Avenue flagship store to the south; and the International Building of Rockefeller Center to the west. St. Patrick's is directly across from the Atlas statue at the International Building.

St. Patrick's is oriented west–east relative to the street grid and has a cruciform plan. From west to east, the cathedral contains a nave; transepts extending to the north and south; and a sanctuary and apse. The entire structure measures 332 feet (101 m) long as measured along the exterior buttresses. The cathedral is 174 feet (53 m) wide at the transepts. (Note: Harper's gives a different measurement of 330 feet (100 m) for the outside length and 172 feet (52 m) for the width at the transept.) The main facade is oriented west along Fifth Avenue, with two towers measuring 32 feet (9.8 m) wide and 329.5 feet (100.4 m) tall, flanking a central section 105 feet (32 m) wide. To the north and south are planted gardens, which contain ten manholes for the cathedral's subterranean geothermal system. The cathedral's total length is 396.7 feet (120.9 m).

The cathedral's interior was designed to accommodate 14,000 seated guests or 19,000 in total. It has a seating capacity for about 2,400 congregants. There are about 300 wooden pews ranging from 10 to 20 feet (3.0 to 6.1 m) wide. The underground geothermal system consists of ten wells, each 2,200 feet (670 m) deep, which could concurrently send hot and cold air to separate sections of the cathedral. The system is capable of producing 3.2 million British thermal units (3.4 GJ) of heat and 2.9 million British thermal units (3.1 GJ) of air conditioning hourly. The geothermal system uses a computer to send cool or warm air based on thermostat readings. Heat and cool air are pumped through four water loops.

=== Western facade ===
==== Central gable and doors ====
The central portion of the Fifth Avenue facade contains a 156-foot-tall (48 m) gable, which leads into the narthex. The main entrance is an archway at the base of the gable, measuring 31 feet (9.4 m) wide and 51 feet (16 m) tall. The actual entrance portal is recessed about 12 feet (3.7 m) into the archway and contains the main doors. The top of the portal is slightly pointed, with carved spandrel panels on either side. Above is a marble transom bar as well as elaborate floral tracery. The portal is flanked by decorative jambs, which in turn are topped by foliage capitals. Atop the jambs are a set of buttresses, which converge to form pointed arches. A gablet rises over the main portal and contains tracery paneling and a shield bearing the arms of the Archdiocese of New York.

The main entrance originally contained a pair of square-headed marble doors. The current bronze doors were designed by Charles Maginnis and sculpted by John Angel, and they were installed in 1949. Each door is 16.5 by 5.5 feet (5.0 by 1.7 m) and weighs 9,200 pounds (4,200 kg). The main doors are generally kept open to welcome visitors; to save energy, a second set of glass pocket doors is installed directly behind. The main doors are decorated with relief sculptures representing three men and three women, with inscriptions indicating their significance to the cathedral and with particular focus on missionary work and assistance for migrants:

The bronze doors of the cathedral, prior to restoration

- St. Joseph, "patron of the Church" (top left)
- St. Patrick, "patron of this Church" (top right)
- St. Isaac Jogues Martyr, "first [Catholic] priest in New York" (middle left)
- St. Frances X Cabrini, "mother of the immigrant" (middle right)
- St. Kateri Tekakwitha, "lily of the Mohawks" (bottom left)
- Mother Elizabeth Seton, "daughter of New York" (bottom right)

Above the central opening is a balustrade made of rich pierced tracery; it contains a row of niches, measuring 7.5 feet (2.3 m) high, for statues. These niches are decorated by columns with foliage capitals and gablets, with tracery and finials. The niches depict six archangels: Michael, Gabriel, Uriel, Raphael, Chamuel, and Jophiel. Above these niches is a rose window, measuring 26 feet (7.9 m) in diameter and designed by Charles Connick. The rose window is blue with red, green, white, and gold panels. The window depicts eight types of leaves at its center, as well as trefoils with white doves. The main gable is carried up to the roof lines, terminating at a cornice with crockets that support a foliated cross. On either side of the jambs of the central window are buttresses, terminated by pinnacles, and between these and the buttresses of the tower are rich Gothic panels, terminated by crocketed gablets.

Just inside the entrance doors, within the narthex, is Adam Cvijanovic's mural What's So Funny About Peace, Love, and Understanding, which depicts immigrants arriving in New York City. The mural consists of 12 panels each measuring 21 feet (6.4 m) high. The upper right corner of the mural depicts religious figures seen at the Apparition at Knock in 1879, while the rest of the artwork depicts both 19th-century immigrants from Ireland and modern-day immigrants from around the world. The mural is largely decorated in a blue palette, and gold and platinum strokes depict the rain that fell during the Apparition at Knock.

==== Towers ====
The towers on either side of the central gable measure 32 by 32 feet (9.8 by 9.8 m) at the base and retain this square cross-section to a height of 136 feet (41 m). The walls of the towers along Fifth Avenue are 12 to 14 feet (3.7 to 4.3 m) thick. The ground story of the towers has portals similar in design to that at the center, but there are shields in the central panel of each gablet. The shield in the left tower has the arms of the United States and the shield in the right tower has the arms of New York. The second story, at the same height as the rose window, has molded jambs and tracery and is topped by gablets with tracery. The third story has four small windows on each side, topped by a cornice and pierced battlement. The towers are flanked by massive buttresses decorated with tabernacles, and the tops of the towers' square portions have clustered pinnacles. Above the square cross-sections are octagonal lanterns measuring 54 feet (16 m) tall. Circular stone stairways and a chime of bells were installed in the towers.

The towers are topped by spires measuring 140 feet (43 m) high. The spires are composed of two tiers with elaborate molding and tracery; the upper tier of each tower had a foliate finial above it. The spires were also planned with octagonal cross-sections, tapering from a base measuring 32 feet (9.8 m) across to a pinnacle measuring 2 feet (0.61 m) across. Also planned within the spires were floors, constructed at intervals of 20 feet (6.1 m).

=== Nave ===
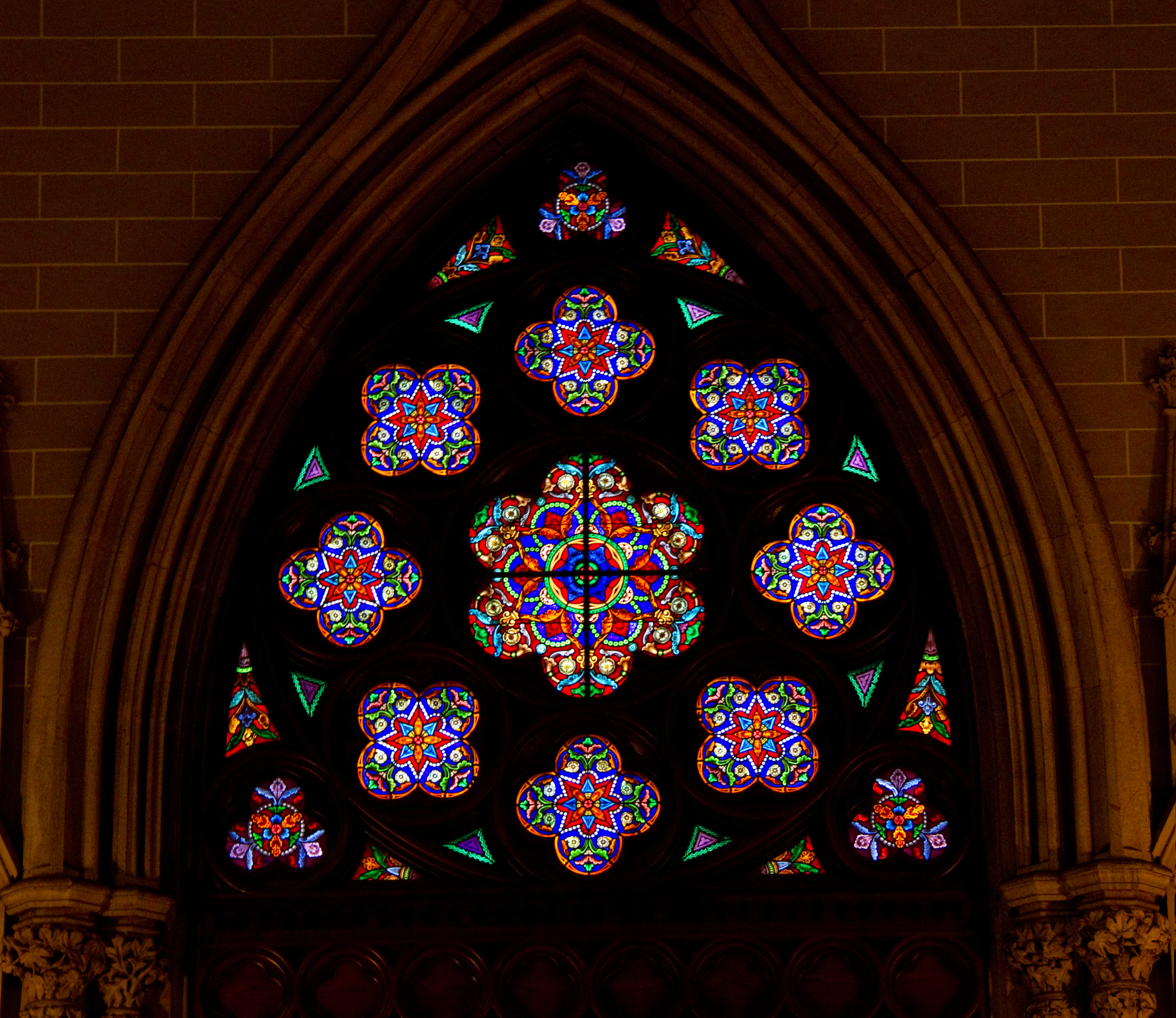
Stained glass example

The nave is about 164 feet (50 m) long as measured from the Fifth Avenue facade. It measures 96 feet (29 m) wide if chapels are not included, or around 120 feet (37 m) wide if the chapels in the side aisles are included. The nave consists of a center aisle and two side aisles running west–east. The center aisle is 48 feet (15 m) wide and 112 feet (34 m) high while the side aisles are 24 feet (7.3 m) wide and 54 feet (16 m) high. Internally, the nave is divided into seven bays from west to east. The westernmost bay is part of the towers along Fifth Avenue and the easternmost bay is part of the transept. The westernmost bay is 26 feet (7.9 m) wide and the other bays are 23 feet (7.0 m) wide. Just inside the entrances within the westernmost bay are busts of Pope Francis, Pope Benedict XVI, Pope John Paul II, and Pope Paul VI, all of whom have previously visited the cathedral.

Thirty-two white marble columns divide the center and side aisles. The marble columns are 5 feet (1.5 m) in diameter and are set up in sections weighing 8 short tons (7.1 long tons; 7.3 t) each. Each column consists of multiple smaller columns: four at the corners, measuring 12 inches (300 mm) in diameter, and eight surrounding the central shaft, measuring 6 inches (150 mm) in diameter. The columns are 35 feet (11 m) tall to the bottom of the arches that support the nave's ceiling. Above the center aisle is a series of groin vaults supported by molded ribs, with foliate bosses at the intersection of each vault. The ceiling has holes with diameters of 1.5 inches (38 mm); ropes could be threaded through these holes to allow repairs and cleaning. The side aisles are similar to those at Saint-Ouen Abbey, Rouen, while the columns and ceiling are similar to British models such as Westminster Abbey.

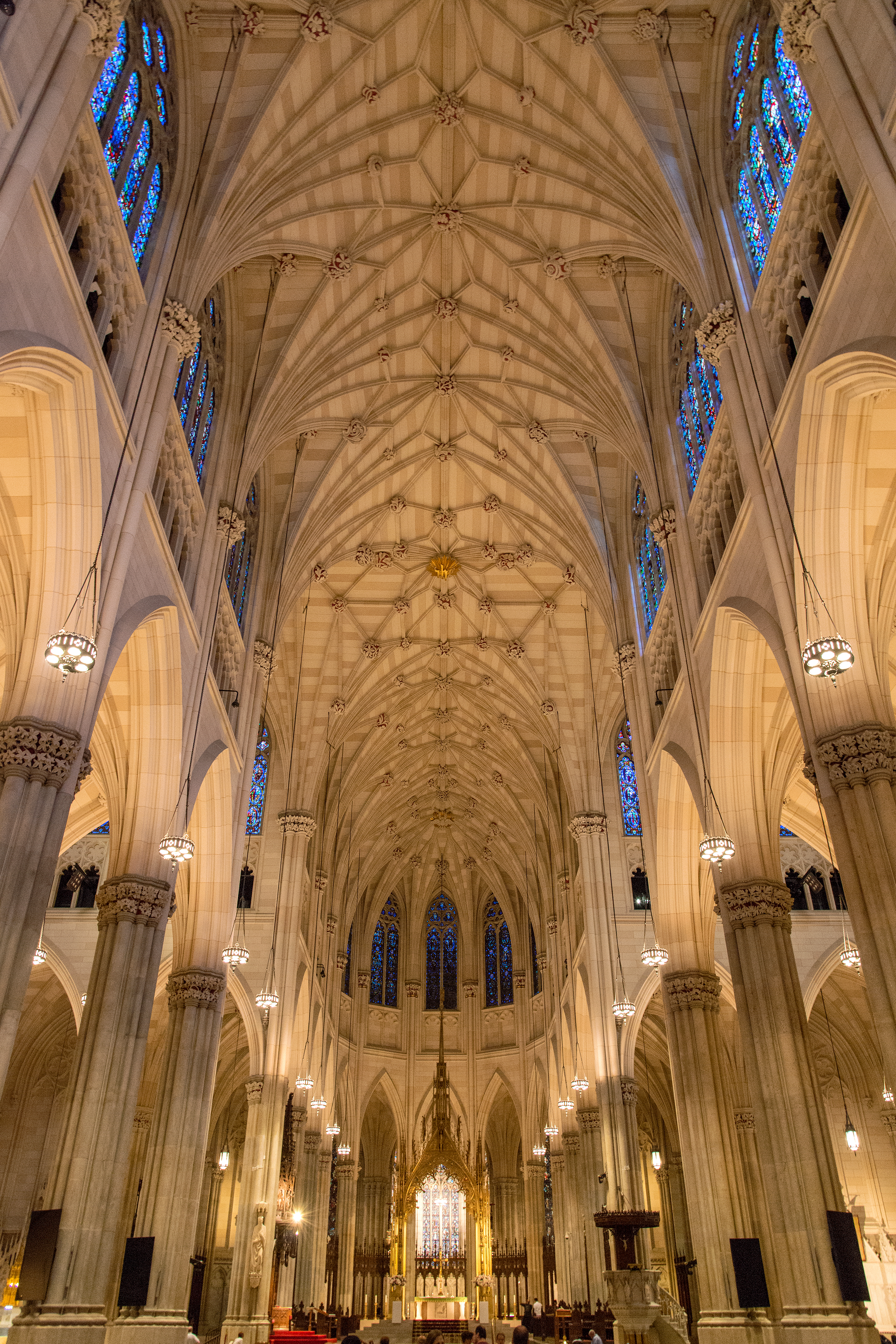
Looking east from the nave toward the altar in the sanctuary

The northern and southern facades are divided into five bays, with buttresses and pinnacles between each bay. The lower section of each bay contains an arched window measuring 13.5 feet (4.1 m) wide and 27 feet (8.2 m) wide. Mullions divide each of these windows vertically into three sections, and the top of each window has tracery. Above these windows is the triforium, which is 56 feet (17 m) above the nave floor. Four arches on either side of the nave support the triforium, which is 16 feet (4.9 m) tall. The clerestory level of the nave rises for 38 feet (12 m) above the triforium and contains six bays. Each clerestory window is 14.5 feet (4.4 m) wide and 26 feet (7.9 m) high. The top of the clerestory is 104 feet (32 m) above ground.

There are twelve chapels in the side aisles. Located under the side aisles' windowsills, the chapels each measure 14 feet (4.3 m) wide and 18 feet (5.5 m) high. The chapels have similar vaulted ceilings to the nave, and each has its their own altars. On the northern side-aisle is a dark-wood baptistery on a marble podium, The baptistery was designed by John La Farge. The chapels include one for St. Bernard and St. Bridget. Among the altars are those for Saint Elizabeth, designed by Roman artist Paolo Medici; a Saint Jean-Baptiste de La Salle altar, sculpted by Dominic Borgia; and the Saint Louis and the Saint Michael altars, designed by Tiffany & Co.

=== Transepts ===
The transepts measure 144 feet (44 m) from north to south. The transepts contain entrances facing north on 51st Street and south on 50th Street. These entrances are similar in design to the central gable on Fifth Avenue. As planned, the transept doorways were to measure 26 feet (7.9 m) wide and 43 feet (13 m) high. The large transept window over the 50th Street door represents St. Patrick, while that over the 51st Street door represents the Immaculate Conception. The transept windows measure 28 feet (8.5 m) wide by 58 feet (18 m) tall and are divided by mullions into six vertical sections. Over each transept window rises a paneled gablet. A row of niches crosses each of the transepts' facades at the eave line. Above this, each facade has a gable with pinnacles and pierced battlements, which in turn is topped by an octagonal pinnacle and foliated cross.

On both sides of either entrance are tall windows. The windows are similar in design to those on the side aisles of the nave. The side windows depict the Four Evangelists. These windows are flanked by octagonal buttresses, which contain spiral stairs leading to the triforium and roofs. The roof at the intersection of the nave and transept contains a central finial 15 feet (4.6 m) high, which is gilded and is decorated with foliage and flowers.

Inside the transepts are the Stations of the Cross, which are carved in stone and were manufactured by the Stoltzenberg Company in Roermond, the Netherlands. There are five Stations of the Cross in total. Three of them received prizes from the World's Columbian Exposition in 1893 before they were installed at the cathedral. In 1908, bronze screens were installed at both transept entrances, measuring 17 feet (5.2 m) tall and 14 feet (4.3 m) wide. The bronze screens were designed so the transepts' wooden doors could open directly into them. Each screen had six wrought-bronze panels with ornamentation. The south transept contained the Altar of the Sacred Heart, which was made of bronze and had an elaborate tabernacle. The north transept contained the Holy Family altar, made of white Carrara marble and dedicated in 1893.

=== Sanctuary ===
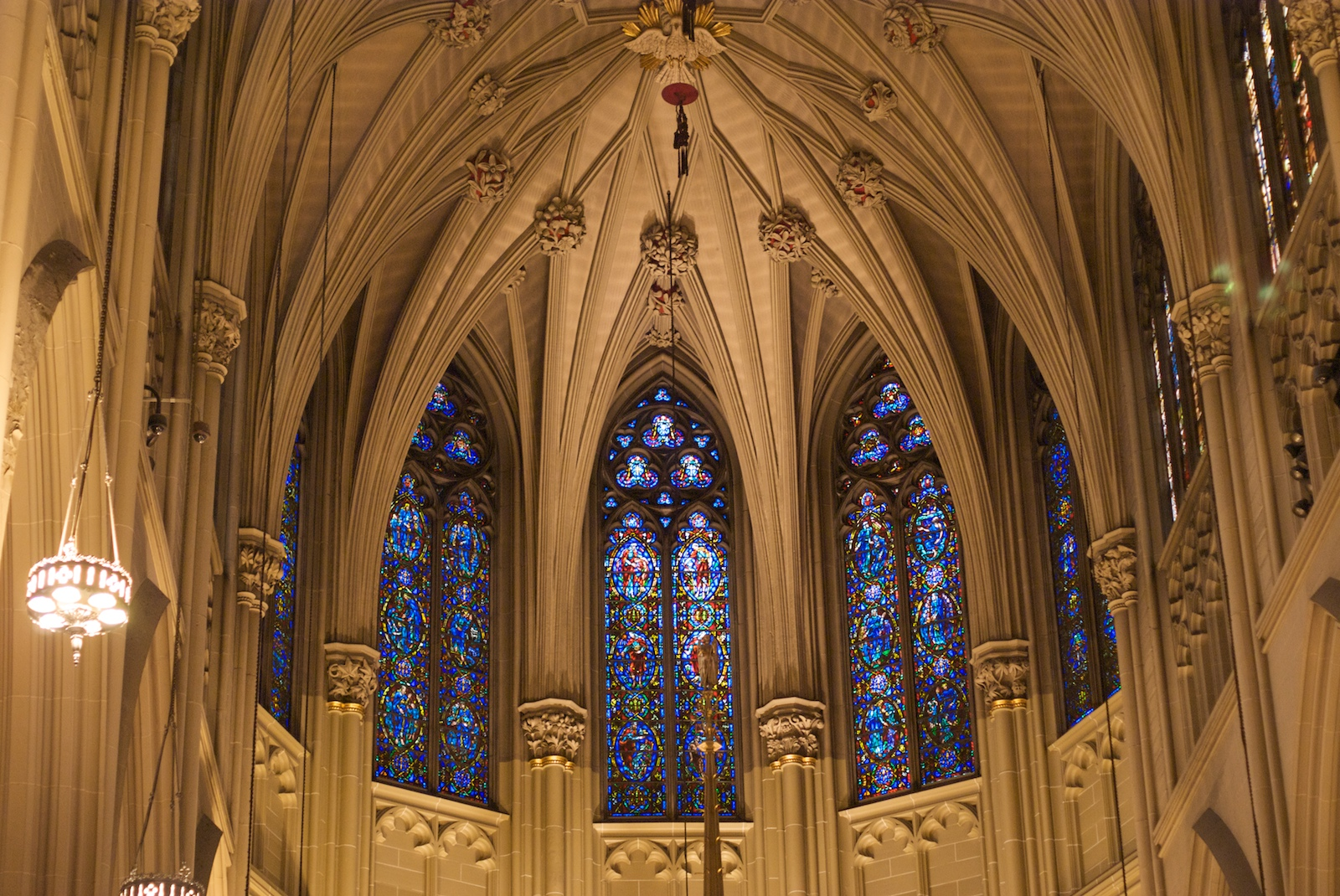
Apsidal stained glass clerestory windows

The sanctuary floor is raised six steps above the floor of the nave, connected to it via a set of gray marble steps. The sanctuary is 95 feet (29 m) long and measures 124 feet (38 m) wide. The roof is made of slate, though the clerestory roof has a metal cresting 5.5 feet (1.7 m) high. There is a 15-foot-high (4.6 m) cross at the east end of the roof, which has flowers and foliage ornaments.

==== Ambulatory ====
The ambulatory, or side aisle of the sanctuary, is divided from west to east into three bays, similar to those in the nave. The apse has a convex polygonal wall with five bays, which are divided by buttresses with pinnacles. Each bay of the apse has a window 14.5 feet (4.4 m) wide and 26 feet (7.9 m) high. The windows are divided by mullions into four vertical sections; they are surmounted by paneled gablets with traceries. The walls between the gablets and pinnacles are finished by pierced battlements. The south ambulatory has a marble Pietà sculpture designed by William Ordway Partridge and completed in 1905. The south ambulatory also contains St. Joseph's Altar, which is made of bronze and mosaic. The first four Cardinals' galeros, (Note: Those belonging to John McCloskey, John Murphy Farley, Patrick Joseph Hayes, and Francis Spellman.) or brimmed red felt hats, are mounted at the back of the sanctuary; the Catholic Church stopped issuing galeros to its cardinals in 1969.

There are eleven windows on the sanctuary's clerestory, of which six represent sacrifice (three each on the north and south sides). The three windows on the north side represent the sacrifices of Abel, Noe, and Melchisedech, while the three on the south side represent the sacrifices of Abraham, the Paschal Lamb, and the Mount of Calvary. The five windows on the convex portion of the apse represent subjects from the history of the Lord. The apsidal windows represent the resurrection of Lazarus, the communion of St. John, the resurrection of Jesus, the giving of the keys of heaven to St. Peter, and Jesus meeting the disciples going to Emmaus.

==== Chancel and high altar ====
The original chancel and high altar, donated by Cardinal McCloskey, were three steps above the sanctuary floor and contained a platform of richly colored marble. The altar was made in Rome and designed in the Italian Gothic style. The altar steps intersected a marble tabernacle inlaid with precious stones and mosaics. Three bas-reliefs on the sides and front of the altar were carved in white marble. The archbishop's pulpit, on the north side of the altar, was made of wood. In 1885, a Gothic-style octagonal pulpit was installed at the south side of the high altar. Weighing 16 short tons (14 long tons; 15 t) and measuring 14 feet (4.3 m) tall, the pulpit was made mostly of Carrara marble, except for six supporting pillars, which were made of Vienna marble. A heavy marble balustrade with carved panels surrounded the main pulpit, which itself was accessed by six marble steps. The altar was compared to a wedding cake when it was first consecrated. In 1930, a 50-foot-long (15 m) marble altar rail was designed by Robert J. Reiley and installed in front of the altar. The rail had carvings of saints.

At the rear of the original high altar was a stylobate with a reredos, or altar screen, measuring 30 feet (9.1 m) long and 10 feet (3.0 m) high. The clergy of the Archdiocese of New York gifted the altar screen, which was carved from Poitiers stone in France. The reredos was divided vertically into five parts: a central portion measuring 6 feet (1.8 m) wide, flanked on either side by panels measuring 7.5 feet (2.3 m) and 4.5 feet (1.4 m) wide. The base of the reredos was made of white marble, inlaid with alabaster and decorated with a bas-relief on each side. The reredos was topped by three towers, one at the center and one on each extreme end. The center tower ascended 48 feet (15 m) above the sanctuary floor while the corner towers ascended 18.5 feet (5.6 m) above the sanctuary floor. The center spire had a statue of Christ, while the other spires had statues of St. Peter and St. Paul. Between the towers were placed six niches with angels, three on either side of the center spire.

In 1942, the original high altar was removed from St. Patrick's Cathedral and consecrated at Fordham University Church in the Bronx. It was replaced with the current high altar, which is made of gray-white Italian marble and topped by a bronze baldachin. Maginnis & Walsh designed the high altar. It lacks a tabernacle and a reredos, similarly to other high altars in cathedrals. The altar table measures 4 feet (1.2 m) deep and about 12 feet (3.7 m) long. The baldachin is supported by four piers; it slopes upward to a pinnacle with a statue of Christ the King. The statue is flanked by smaller pinnacles with angelic figures. The pulpit is along the south (right) side of the right altar.

=== Crypt ===
Under the high altar is a crypt in which notable Catholic figures that served the Archdiocese of New York are entombed. It is accessed by a set of doors behind the high altar. Originally, the entrance to the crypt was hidden by a heavy stone slab that required six people to lift. A stone staircase descended to a vault behind a set of slate doors. Large bronze letters with the names of those buried in the crypt are inscribed in the crypt doors. The crypt is about 21 feet (6.4 m) long and 10 feet (3.0 m) high, with a width of 10 feet (3.0 m) between the rows of coffins on either side. The crypt is square in plan except for a ventilating pipe at the southeast corner. It has space to bury either 24 or 42 people.

The crypt's interments include all nine past deceased Archbishops of New York:

- John Joseph Hughes (Archbishop, 1850–1864; interred 1883)
- John McCloskey (Archbishop, 1864–1885; interred 1885)
- Michael Augustine Corrigan (Archbishop, 1885–1902; interred 1902)
- John Murphy Farley (Archbishop, 1902–1918; interred 1918)
- Patrick Joseph Hayes (Archbishop, 1919–1938; interred 1938)
- Francis Joseph Spellman (Archbishop, 1939–1967; interred 1967)
- Terence James Cooke (Archbishop, 1968–1983; interred 1983)
- John Joseph O'Connor (Archbishop, 1984–2000; interred 2000)
- Edward Michael Egan (Archbishop, 2000–2009; interred 2015)

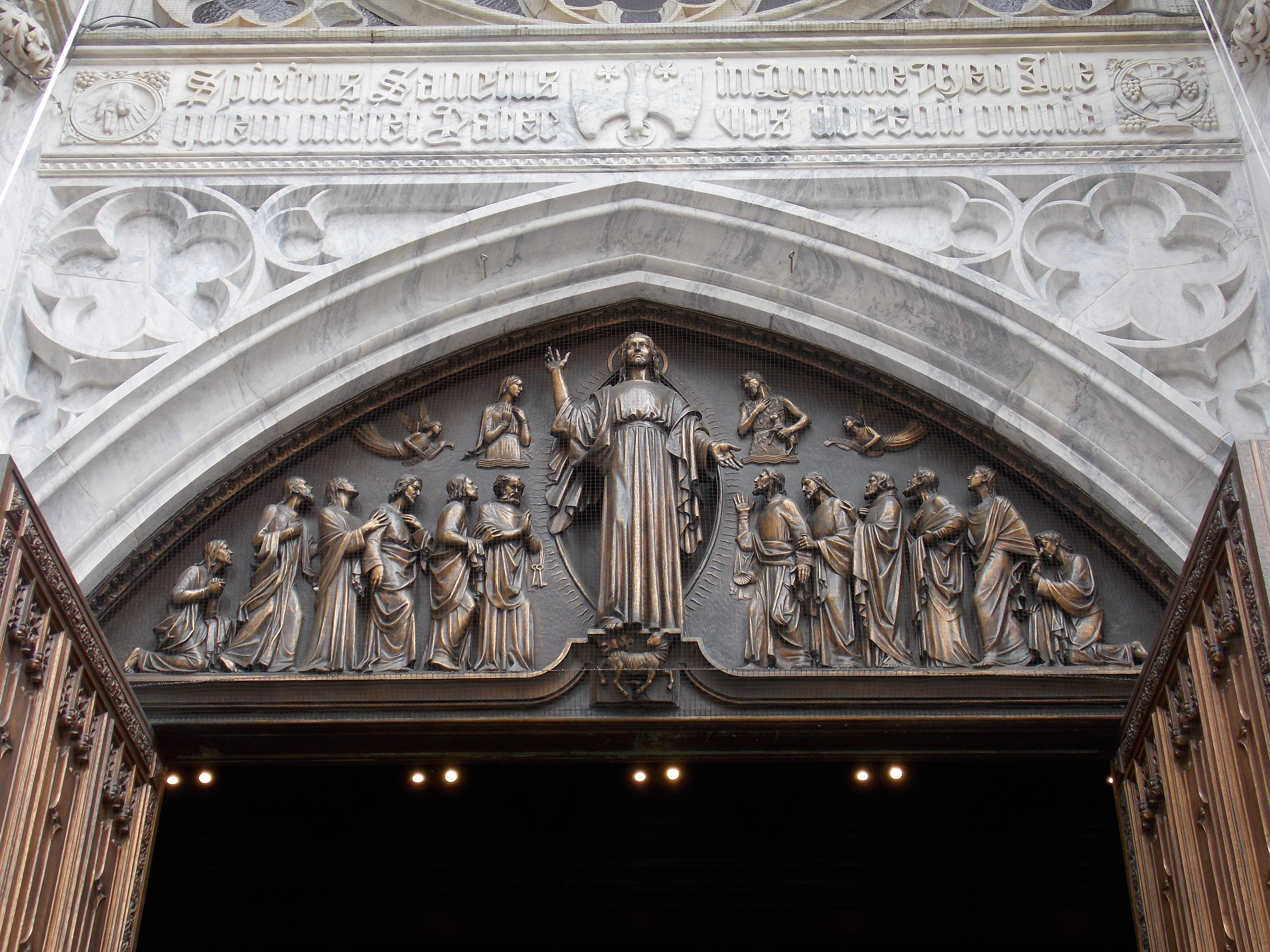
The tympanum above the main entrance in 2016

Other interments include:

- Michael J. Lavelle (Cathedral Rector, 1887–1939, and Vicar General; interred 1939)
- Joseph F. Flannelly (Cathedral Rector, 1939–1969, and Auxiliary Bishop, 1948–1969; interred 1973)
- John Maguire (Coadjutor Archbishop, 1965–1980; interred 1989)
- Pierre Toussaint (interred 1990) – at the time of his interment, the only Catholic layperson to be interred at the cathedral

Fulton J. Sheen, Auxiliary Bishop of New York from 1951 to 1965 and later Bishop of Rochester, was interred in the crypt upon his death in 1979. During the late 2010s, the Archdiocese of New York and his relatives were involved in a three-year court dispute to keep his remains at St. Patrick's Cathedral. On June 27, 2019, Sheen's remains were disinterred from St. Patrick's and transferred to St. Mary's Cathedral in Peoria, Illinois, where he had been ordained.

== Cathedral close ==
=== Lady chapel ===
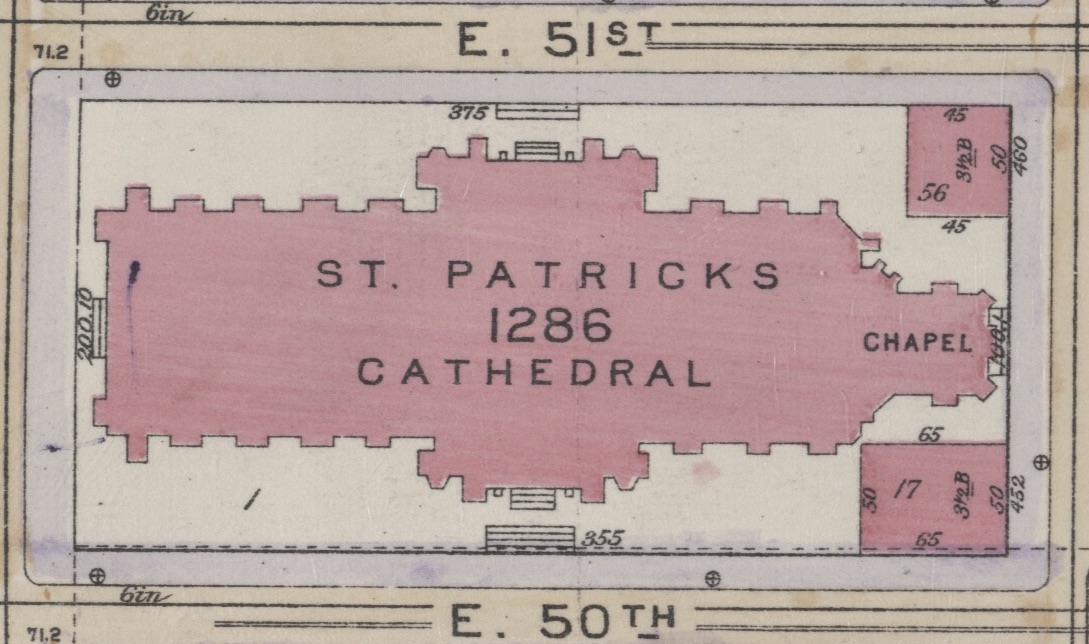
Map of the cathedral close of St. Patrick's Cathedral in 1916. At right are depicted (from top to bottom) the rectory, Lady chapel, and archbishop's residence.

The Lady chapel, designed by Charles T. Mathews, is east of the apse, facing along Madison Avenue. It was designed in a 13th-century Gothic style. The rear wall of the apse was partly removed in the first decade of the 20th century to allow the construction of an ambulatory around the choir's outer wall. The removed section of the apse's wall became part of Our Lady of Lourdes Church at that time. The chapel was designed with a roof and belfry made of green bronze, as well as walls surrounded by statues. The walls of the chapel were designed to be plain at the bottom, becoming progressively more elaborately designed at the top. Several gargoyles were designed as decoration for the chapel's exterior. The chapel contains fifteen stained-glass windows depicting the mysteries of the rosary, five each for glorious, joyful, and sorrowful scenes. The Lady chapel has nine tall windows, as well as two side chapels with three windows each.

The chapel is separated from the apse by a 48-foot-tall (15 m) glass wall that rests on a 23-foot-wide (7.0 m) glass beam. The glass wall is designed with a minimalist bronze frame. The interior of the Lady chapel was designed with carved stonework. The original altar, dedicated to the Virgin Mary, had a high carved reredos, a mosaic floor, and a blue color scheme. The altar was replaced in 1942. The new altar is reached by three brown-marble steps. It consists of a white-marble reredos, an altar table, with a multicolored inlaid marble frontal named "Annunciation" designed by Hildreth Meiere, and a statue of the Lady on top. Under the Lady chapel is a crypt for the Kelly family, which had paid for the chapel.

=== Rectory ===
The rectory (originally the Vicar General's house) is at the southwest corner with 51st Street, on the northeastern section of the cathedral close. It carries the address 460 Madison Avenue. The Gothic-style building is three and a half stories high and is clad with Tuckahoe stone and white marble. As designed, it covers a lot measuring 54 by 47 feet (16 by 14 m). The basement was originally designed as the kitchen, laundry, and servants' quarters. The first floor had a hall clad with marble tiles; the reception and dining rooms were on the left and two parlors were on the right of the hall. The second and third floors were designed as bedrooms. White oak and black walnut was used throughout the building. The rectory had ceilings of 14 feet (4.3 m) on the first and second floors, 12 feet (3.7 m) on the third floor, and 12 feet (3.7 m) on the fourth. It had 30 rooms in total.

The rectory was substantially unchanged from its early-1880s construction until 1940. A new window was installed on the southern facade at ground level; new plumbing, electric wiring, an elevator, and a telephone switchboard were installed; and the curtains were replaced. The two first-floor parlors were converted into four offices and a waiting room, and the upper stories were divided into smaller bedrooms and studies. The rectory retained some original design features such as its black-walnut fireplace mantels.

In 1920, the rectory also hosted the marriage of F. Scott Fitzgerald and Zelda Fitzgerald.

=== Archbishop's residence ===
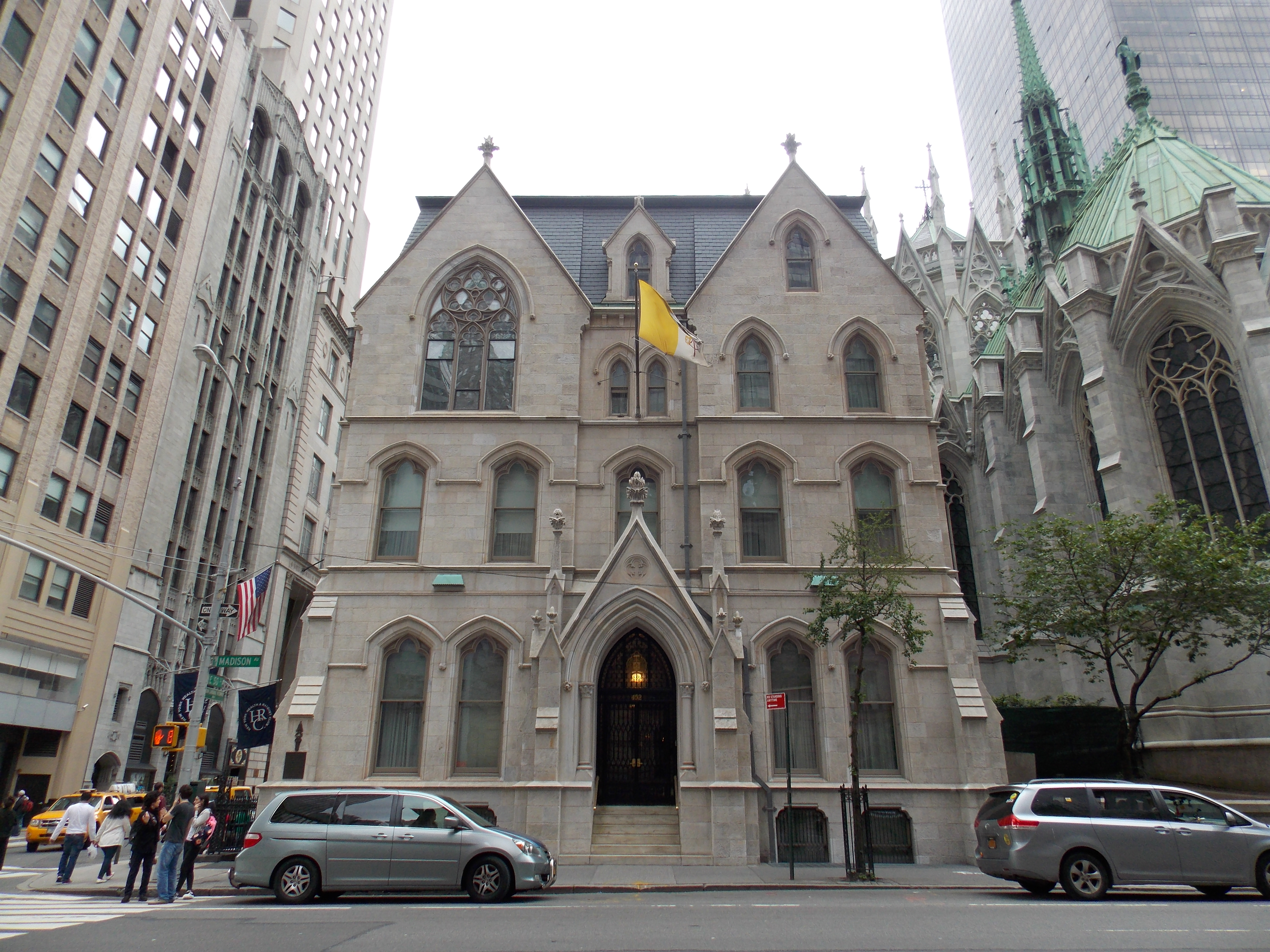
Archbishop's Residence

The archbishop's residence is at the northwest corner with 50th Street, occupying the southeastern section of the cathedral close. It carries the address 452 Madison Avenue. The archbishop's residence covers 15,000 square feet (1,400 m^{2}). The Gothic-style building is three and a half stories high and is also clad with white marble. A plaque commemorating Pope Paul VI's 1965 visit to the cathedral is mounted on the facade.

As of 2015, Cardinal Dolan shares the archbishop's house with three other priests. On the third floor is a chapel for John the Apostle. The right-side wall has a plaque measuring 18 by 12 inches (460 by 300 mm) with a holy water font made of silver. The Assumption of Mary, flanked by cherubs, is depicted atop the holy water font. The font was given by Pope Paul VI to Cardinal Cooke in 1971.

== Staff ==
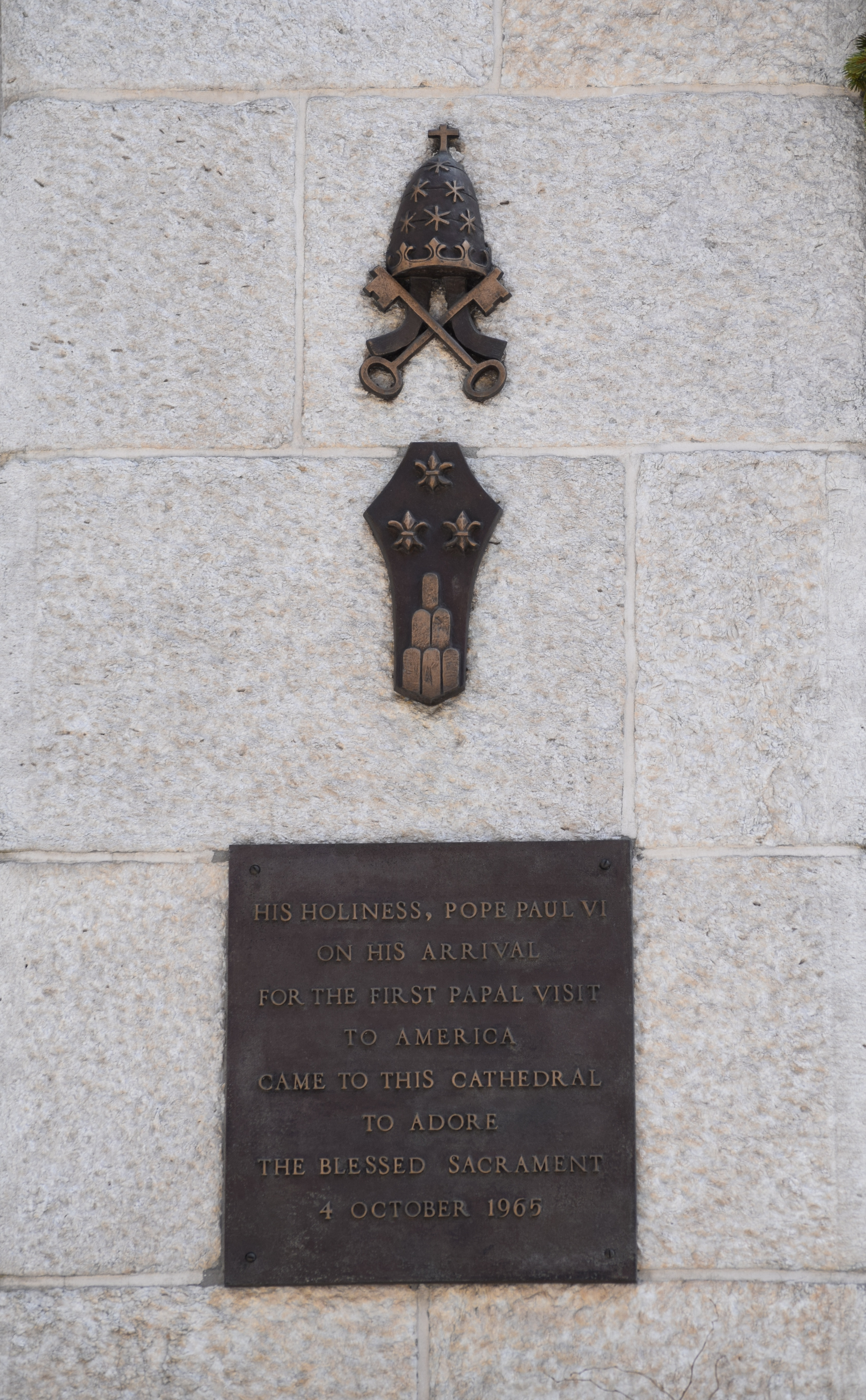
Plaque commemorating Pope Paul VI's visit to the cathedral in 1965

As of 2026, Ronald Hicks is the Archbishop of New York, having served in this position since 2026. Since November 2021, Enrique Salvo has served as the rector of the cathedral. In addition, Rev. Andrew King is the master of ceremonies, and Rev. Donald Haggerty, Rev. Arthur Golino, and Rev. Ed Dougherty are also on staff. Rev. John Mccarthy serves as Archbishop Hicks's Priest Secretary. The director of music is Jennifer Pascual. The associate directors of music, who also serve as organists, are Daniel Brondel and Michael Hey. In addition, Robert M. Evers is the Music Administrator and Programs Editor.

== Bells ==
There are nineteen bells at St. Patrick's Cathedral. The bells were created by the firm of Messrs. Paccard in France and installed in 1897. They hang in the northern tower of St. Patrick's Cathedral 180 feet (55 m) above ground. Since there are fewer than 23 bells, the minimum needed to be able to ring two octaves, they hang in a chime instead of a carillon. A 1983 New York Times article reported that the chime was rung every day at 8 a.m., noon, and 6 p.m. Additionally, on Sundays, the chime was rung every 15 minutes between 10 a.m. and noon and every 15 minutes between 5 p.m. and 7 p.m.

Originally, the bells were powered by a compressed air mechanism in the basement. Pressing a key on the keyboard in the sacristy would activate an electric signal, which in turn would release the compressed air to ring each bell. According to The New York Times, St. Patrick's bells were the first to be operated by compressed air. Until 1952, the bells could also be rung using tracker action; the bell-ringer would pull a 110-foot-long (34 m) rod between the lever and clapper of each bell.

Each of the bells was donated by a different person or organization. The name of the bell, its donor, and the figure of the crucifixion is carved on each respective bell.

Name	Tone	Approximate Weight (Note: Weight is rounded to the nearest pound according to St. Patrick's website. Compressed Air gives slightly different weight notations for all of these bells.)	Donor
St. Patrick	B♭	6,608 pounds (2,997 kg)	Congregation of St. Patrick's Cathedral
Blessed Virgin (Note: Also originally named Our Lady's)	C	4,626 pounds (2,098 kg)	John B. Manning
St. Joseph	D	3,260 pounds (1,480 kg)	Joseph J. O'Donohue
Holy Name	E♭	2,693 pounds (1,222 kg)	Holy Name Society
St. Michael	E	2,319 pounds (1,052 kg)	M. C. Coleman
St. Anne	F	1,956 pounds (887 kg)	Henry McAleenan
St. Elizabeth	G	1,357 pounds (616 kg)	Marquise di San Marzano
St. Augustine of Hippo	A♭	1,163 pounds (528 kg)	Augustin Daly
St. Anthony of Padua	A	971 pounds (440 kg)	I. L. Fox
St. Agnes	B♭	802 pounds (364 kg)	Lydia Fox
St. John the Evangelist	B	668 pounds (303 kg)	John D. Crimmins
St. Bridget	C	574 pounds (260 kg)	Perry and Catherine I. Minister
St. Francis Xavier	C♯	476 pounds (216 kg)	Congregation of St. Francis Xavier Church
St. Peter	D	402 pounds (182 kg)	George B. Coleman
St. Cecilia	E♭	345 pounds (156 kg)	Mrs. Thomas I. Ryan
St. Helena	E	286 pounds (130 kg)	Leonora and Agnes Keyes
St. Alphonsus Liguori	F	241 pounds (109 kg)	Mary A. Mills
St. Thomas Aquinas	F♯	204 pounds (93 kg)	Thomas Kelly
St. Godfrey	G	173 pounds (78 kg)	Children of Godfrey Amend

== Organs ==
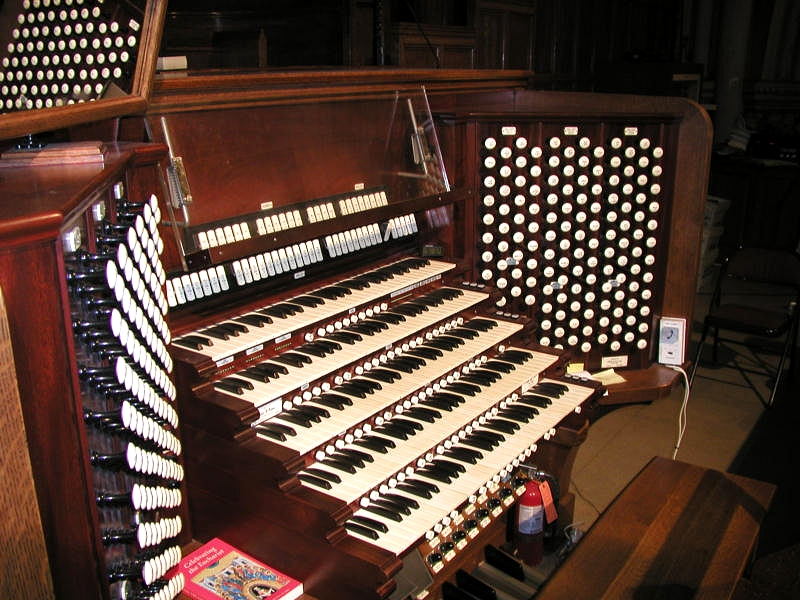
Organ manual for the Gallery Organ

St. Patrick's Cathedral has two pipe organs with more than 9,000 pipes, 206 stops, 150 ranks, and 10 divisions between them. The two organs are the Gallery Organ, completed in 1930, and the Chancel Organ, completed in 1928; both were manufactured by George Kilgen & Son. Since the mid-1990s, the two organs have been able to operate as a single unit. The two organs are controlled by twin 5-manual drawknob consoles and have 207 registers, 116 stops, and 142 ranks between them.

The Chancel Organ is in the north ambulatory of the sanctuary, adjoining the Chapel of St. Joseph. It originally had three manuals, which controlled four divisions. The Chancel Organ originally had 46 registers, 18 stops, and 18 ranks. There were 1,480 pipes, placed inside an oak case with Gothic-style carvings. The Gallery Organ is in the western part of the nave below the Fifth Avenue rose window, as well as in the triforium near the south transept. The Gallery Organ had a four-manual stopkey console with 157 registers and 114 ranks. There were 7,855 pipes; the shortest measured 0.5 inches (13 mm) long and the longest, 32 feet (9.8 m) long, crossed the triforia.

=== Organ history ===
The first organ was built by George Jardine & Son and installed in 1879. It was composed of four manuals, 51 stops, and 56 ranks. In 1880, J.H. & C.S. Odell installed an organ in the chancel with 2 manuals, 20 stops and 23 ranks.

George Kilgen & Son designed the two current organs after Pietro Yon was hired to the music staff in the late 1920s. The Chancel Organ was dedicated on January 30, 1928, while the Gallery Organ was dedicated on February 11, 1930. Tonal modifications were made in the 1940s and 1950s, and additional renovations occurred in the 1970s and 1980s. In 1993, while John-Michael Caprio was music director, the old four-manual gallery console and the old three-manual chancel console were replaced with twin five-manual consoles. In early 1994, the Peragallo Pipe Organ Company removed the Gallery Organ’s façade pipes for cleaning. That same year, Peragallo made repairs to the organ, addressing the known and pressing issues at the time, and the Chancel Organ underwent remedial repairs. The Echo Organ, situated in the south triforium near the center crossing, underwent tonal modifications, making it generally more robust. It was renamed the Nave Organ. These aforementioned modifications were finished in 1997. The Gallery and Chancel organs were removed at different times to make room for scaffolding during the cathedral's 2012-2015 restoration; the Chancel Organ was re-installed in 2014, followed the next year by the Gallery Organ.

In March 2024, the Canadian organ company Casavant Frères began the first complete renovation of the organs. The Chancel Organ was disassembled first and sent to Canada. Cardinal Dolan began raising funds for the renovation on December 19, 2024. The organ was reinstalled in March 2025, and the re-voicing was completed on April 4, 2025. The dismantling of the Gallery Organ and Nave Organ began on May 12, 2025. They are expected to return from Canada fully renovated in the spring of 2027.

=== Directors of music ===
In the first nine decades of St. Patrick's Cathedral's history, it only had four music directors. The first organist and director of music at the current St. Patrick's Cathedral was William F. Pecher, who had been hired at the Old Cathedral in 1862 and served at the current cathedral from 1879 to his death in 1904. Afterward, Jacques C. Ungerer served as the director of music until 1929. He was succeeded by Pietro Yon, who at the time was an assistant director. When Yon suffered a stroke in 1943, Dr. Charles Marie Courboin was temporarily appointed to Yon's position. Yon died the same year and Courboin served as music director until 1970.

The cathedral's fifth music director, John Grady, served as a music director and organist from 1970 to his death in 1990. Grady was succeeded by John-Michael Caprio, who also served until his death, in 1997. Four people served as directors over the following six years: John C. West (1997–1999), Robert Long (1999–2001), Don Stefano Concordia (2001), and Johannes Somary (2001–2003). Since 2003, Jennifer Pascual has served as the music director, being the first woman to hold this position.

== Notable funerals and weddings ==
Notable people whose Requiem Masses were said at the cathedral include:

- Hugh Carey, former Governor of New York
- George M. Cohan, actor and dancer
- Celia Cruz, singer
- Robert F. Kennedy, former Attorney General and U.S. Senator from New York
- Vince Lombardi, football coach
- Wellington Mara, New York Giants owner
- Roger Maris, player for the New York Yankees
- Billy Martin, player for the New York Yankees
- Steven McDonald, New York City Police Department officer
- Babe Ruth, player for the New York Yankees
- Ed Sullivan, entertainer and host

Special memorial Masses were also held at the cathedral following the deaths of several people:

- William F. Buckley Jr., author
- Joe DiMaggio, baseball player
- Andy Warhol, artist

High profile weddings have been hosted there as well, included Eunice Kennedy and Sargent Shriver, Jean Kennedy and Stephen Edward Smith, and F. Scott Fitzgerald and Zelda Fitzgerald.

== Incidents ==
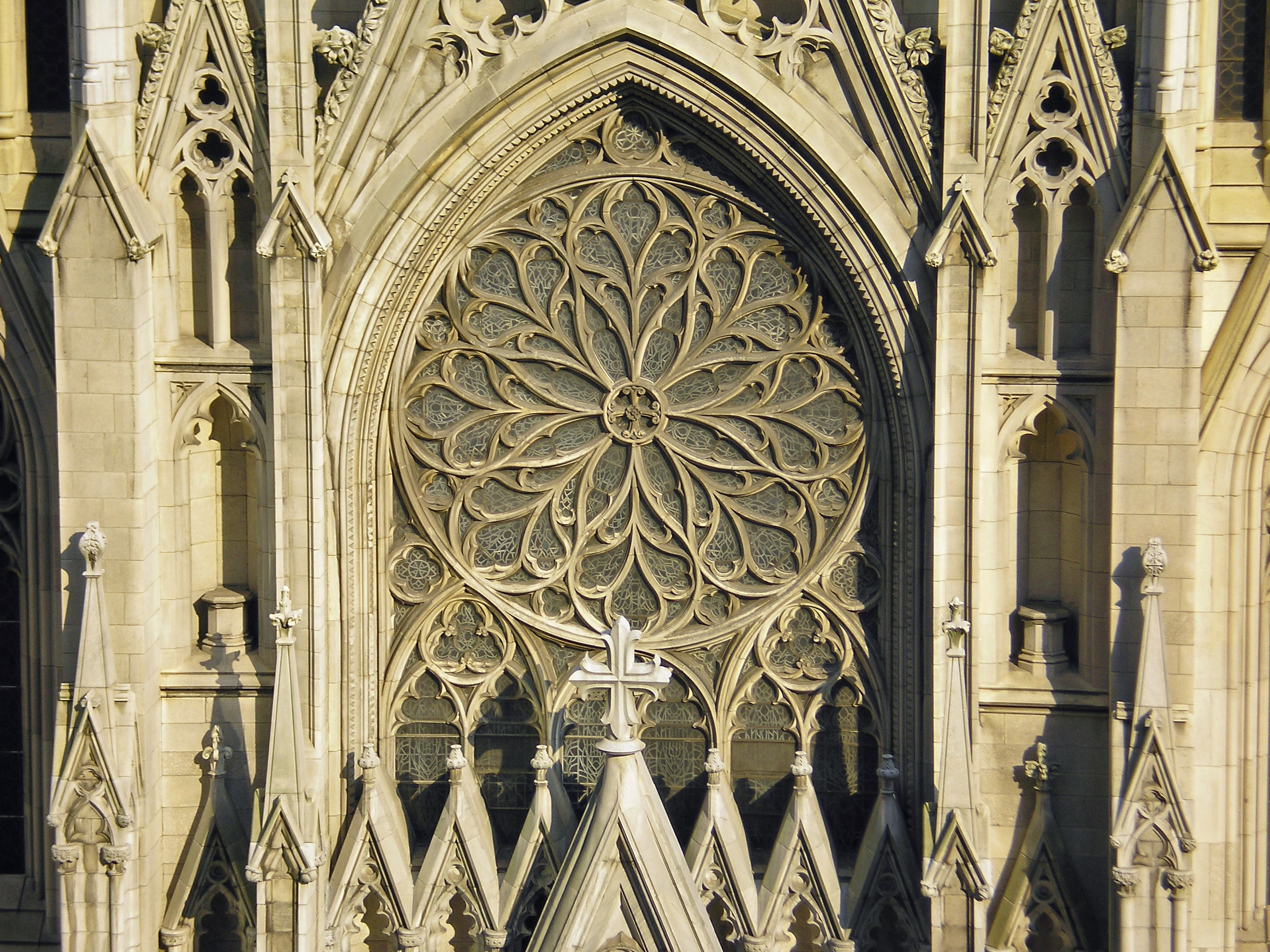
Facade detail

Over the years, St. Patrick's Cathedral has been targeted by bombings and threats:

- On October 13, 1914, a bomb exploded on the northwest corner of the cathedral. It tore an 18-inch hole in the floor. One injury was reported: a boy whose head was grazed by a flying piece of metal.
- In March 1915, Italian anarchists Frank Abarno and Carmine Carbone of the Bresci Circle were arrested for attempting to detonate a bomb in the cathedral.
- In January 1951, a letter threatened that a bomb would be set off at a Sunday Mass, but the Mass continued without any disruption. Another, telephoned bomb threat occurred in June 1953.
- On April 18, 2019, just two days after a fire damaged the Notre-Dame de Paris, a 37-year-old New Jersey man carrying a pair of full two-gallon cans of gasoline, two bottles of lighter fluid, and two extended butane lighters was arrested after attempting to enter the cathedral. The man was a philosophy professor at nearby Seton Hall University who suffered from schizophrenia.

In addition, there have been numerous instances of vandalism:

- In 1944, red paint was splashed on the cathedral. The paint was smeared in a pattern similar to the hammer and sickle of a communist party.
- On May 30, 2020, during the nationwide protests and riots following the murder of George Floyd, Black Lives Matter protesters spray-painted pro-BLM and anti-police slogans on the facade. Two people were charged the following month for the crime.
- On New Year's Day 2021, the cathedral was vandalized again with anti-police graffiti.

Other incidents have included:

- A 2020 report by the Vatican accepted earlier reports that the laicized Cardinal Theodore McCarrick committed acts of sex abuse at the cathedral between 1971 and 1972.
- On September 21, 1988, a mentally ill man killed an usher and seriously injured an officer before being fatally shot.
- On December 10, 1989, ACT UP, a pressure group that advocates for AIDS awareness, led a demonstration of 4,500 people outside the cathedral as part of their Stop the Church campaign. About 130 infiltrated the church and disrupted the Mass, forcing Cardinal John O'Connor to abandon his sermon.
- In 2002, "shock jocks" Opie and Anthony held a promotion that encouraged listeners of their radio show to have sex in risky places. Two listeners were caught in a vestibule of the church doing so; they were arrested, along with comedian Paul Mecurio.
- On February 15, 2024, a funeral service was held for LGBTQ activist Cecilia Gentili, during which eulogies were delivered, which were denounced as irreverent and the behavior by attendees was denounced as sacrilegious and scandalous by the New York Archdiocese. Cardinal Dolan ordered a Mass of Reparation to be offered in reparation for the incident.

== See also ==
- List of Catholic cathedrals in the United States
- List of cathedrals in the United States
- List of tallest structures built before the 20th century
- Archdiocese of New York
  - Catholic Archbishops of New York, a list of all archbishops of St. Patrick's Cathedral
- List of New York City Designated Landmarks in Manhattan from 14th to 59th Streets
- National Register of Historic Places listings in Manhattan from 14th to 59th Streets
