= Charles Thompson Mathews =

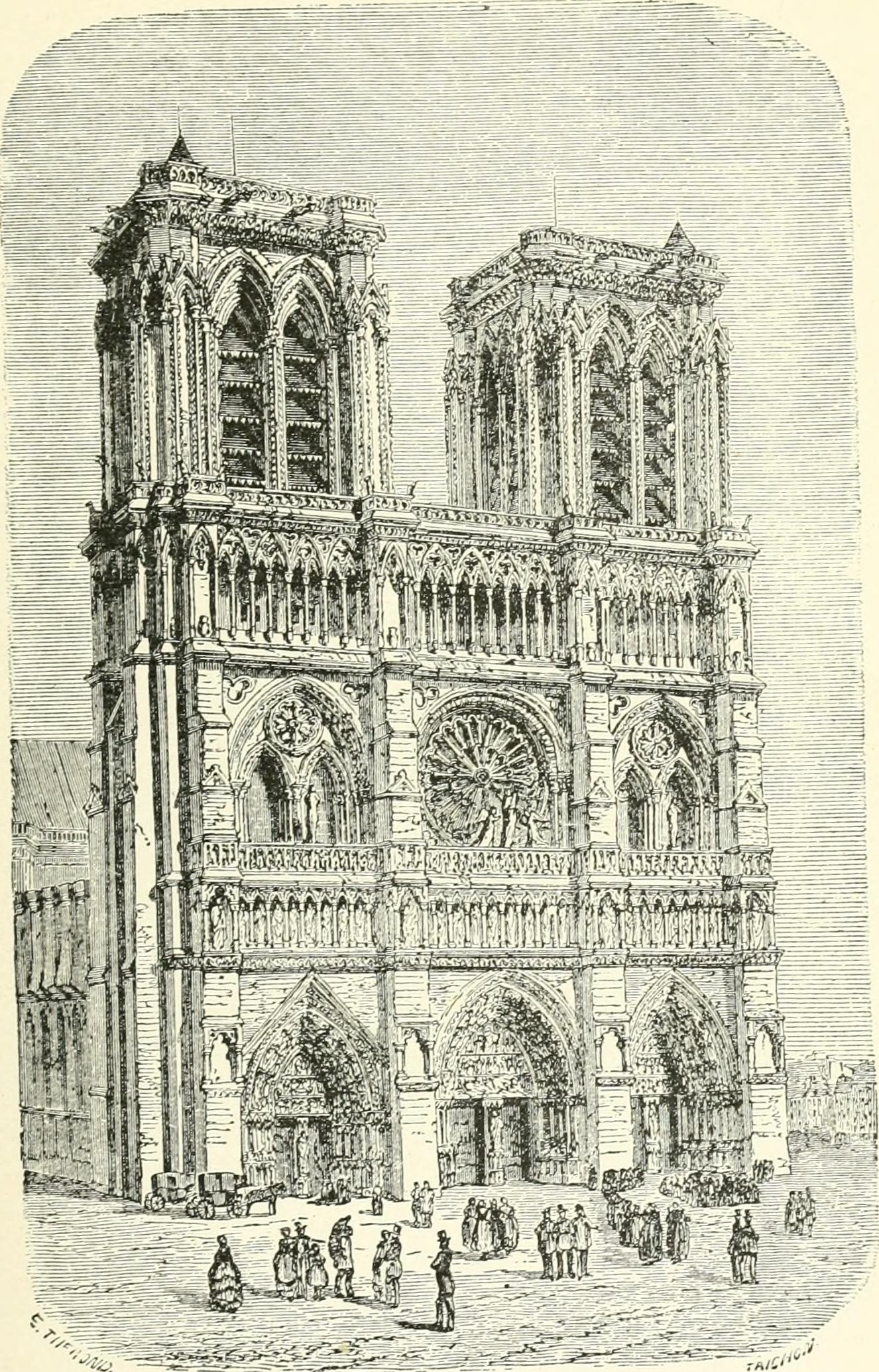
The Story of Architecture, by Charles Thompson Mathews.

Charles Thompson Mathews (March 31, 1863 – January 11, 1934) was an American architect, author and philanthropist. He was also a founder of the American Society for the Relief of French Orphans.

Mathews was born in Paris, to American parents, Charles Drelincourt Matthews and Rebecca Thompson Matthews. He graduated from Yale University with a bachelor's degree in 1886, and also obtained a degree in architecture from Columbia University's School of Mines in 1889. He also received a master's degree from Columbia, in 1892.

In 1891 Mathews won a competition to design the Episcopal Church of the Holy Trinity in New York. In 1901 his design was used to remodel the east end of St. Patrick's Cathedral in New York. The Lady Chapel in St. Patrick's is his design.

During World War I, Mathews served in the United States Food Administration.

Mathews' books include The Renaissance Under the Valois (1893), and The Story of Architecture (1896).
