= List of Pontifical North American College alumni =

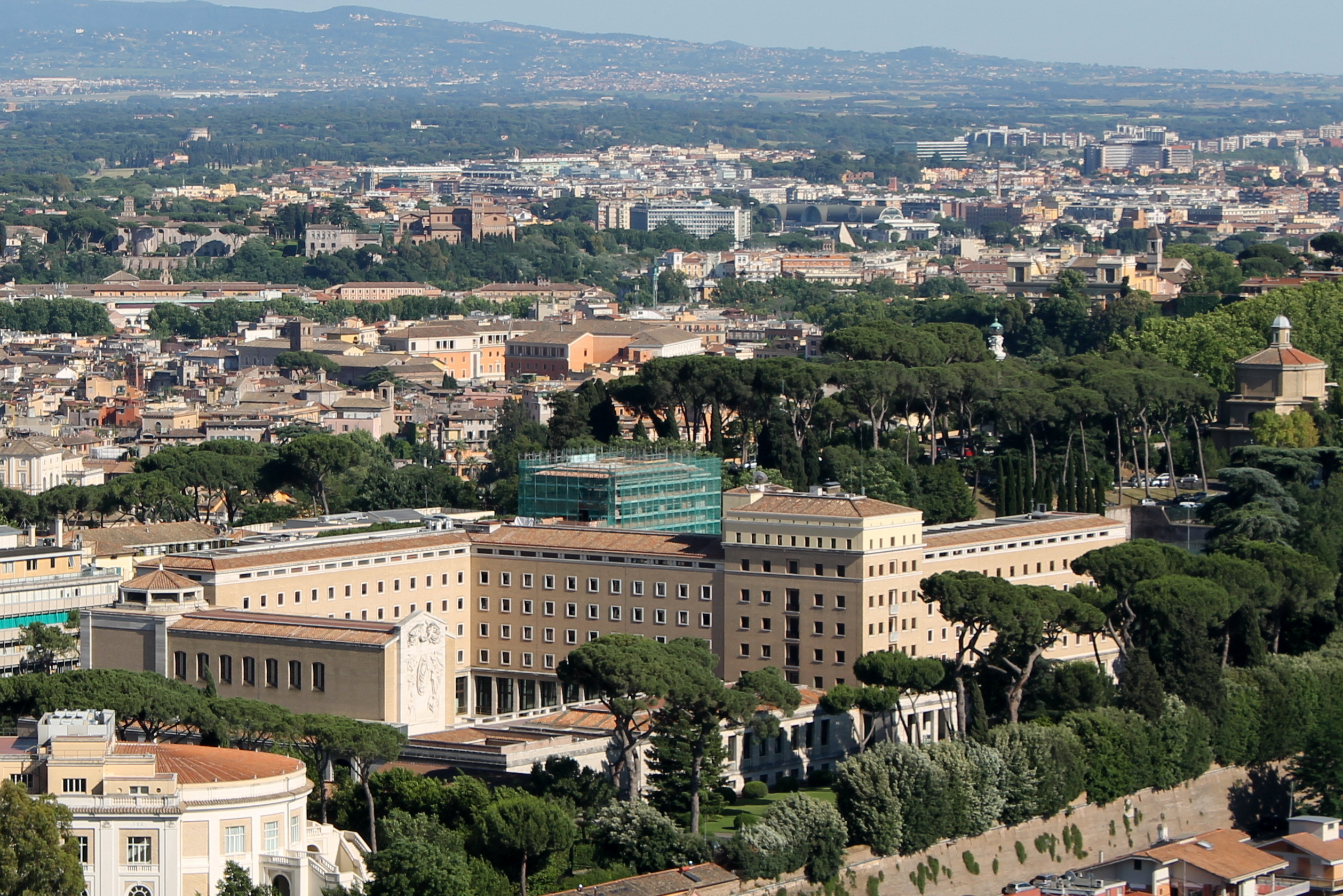
The Janiculum campus of the Pontifical North American College, as seen from the dome of St. Peter's Basilica in June 2014.

This is a partial list of notable alumni of the Pontifical North American College in Rome, a Catholic educational institution that forms and educates seminarians and student priests for dioceses in the United States (as well as Canada and Australia). It was founded in 1859.

If the prelates and priests listed here completed their normal course of pre-ordination theology studies while at the North American College (in general, the bachelor and licentiate), only their year of ordination is given; if they were sent to the College for graduate studies or continuing education after ordination, then that graduate degree or program is listed.

== Cardinals ==
- Anthony Cardinal Bevilacqua, Archbishop of Philadelphia (doctorate, 1956)
- Raymond Cardinal Burke, Patron of the Sovereign Military Order of Malta (ordained 1975)
- John Cardinal Carberry, Archbishop of St. Louis (ordained 1929)
- John Cardinal Cody, Archbishop of Chicago (ordained 1931)
- Blase Cardinal Cupich, Archbishop of Chicago (ordained 1975)
- John Cardinal Dearden, Archbishop of Detroit (ordained 1932)
- Daniel Cardinal DiNardo, Archbishop of Galveston-Houston (ordained 1977)
- Timothy Cardinal Dolan, Archbishop of New York (ordained 1976)
- Dennis Cardinal Dougherty, Archbishop of Philadelphia (ordained 1890)
- Edward Cardinal Egan, Archbishop of New York (ordained 1957)
- John Cardinal Farley, Archbishop of New York (ordained 1870)
- John Cardinal Foley, Grand Master of the Equestrian Order of the Holy Sepulchre of Jerusalem (doctorate, 1965)
- James Cardinal Harvey, Archpriest of the Basilica of Saint Paul Outside the Walls (ordained 1975)
- James Cardinal Hickey, Archbishop of Washington (graduate studies, 1951)
- William Cardinal Keeler, Archbishop of Baltimore (ordained 1955)
- John Cardinal Krol, Archbishop of Philadelphia (licentiate, 1940)
- William Cardinal Levada, Prefect of the Congregation for the Doctrine of the Faith (ordained 1961)
- Adam Cardinal Maida, Archbishop of Detroit (licentiate, 1960)
- Timothy Cardinal Manning, Archbishop of Los Angeles (doctorate, 1938)
- Robert Cardinal McElroy, Bishop of San Diego (doctorate, 1986)
- Humberto Cardinal Sousa Medeiros, Archbishop of Boston (doctorate, 1952)
- Albert Cardinal Meyer, Archbishop of Chicago (ordained 1926)
- Edward Cardinal Mooney, Archbishop of Detroit (ordained 1909)
- George Cardinal Mundelein, Archbishop of Chicago (pre-ordination studies; ordained 1895)
- Edwin Cardinal O'Brien, Grand Master of the Equestrian Order of the Holy Sepulchre of Jerusalem (doctorate, 1976)
- William Cardinal O'Connell, Archbishop of Boston (ordained 1884)
- Justin Cardinal Rigali, Archbishop of Philadelphia (graduate studies, 1964)
- Lawrence Cardinal Shehan, Archbishop of Baltimore (doctorate, 1923)
- Francis Cardinal Spellman, Archbishop of New York (ordained 1916)
- James Cardinal Stafford, Major Penitentiary of the Apostolic Penitentiary (ordained 1957)
- Samuel Cardinal Stritch, Archbishop of Chicago (ordained 1910)
- Edmund Cardinal Szoka, Archbishop of Detroit (doctorate, 1959)
- Donald Cardinal Wuerl, Archbishop of Washington (ordained 1966)

== Archbishops ==
- Michael Banach, Titular Bishop of Memphis and Apostolic Nuncio to Papua New Guinea and the Solomon Islands (ordained 1988)
- Gerald Bergan, Archbishop of Omaha (ordained 1915)
- Daniel A. Cronin, Archbishop of Hartford (ordained 1952)
- Henry J. Mansell, Archbishop of Hartford, (ordained 1963)
- Leonard Blair, Archbishop of Hartford (ordained 1975)
- Christopher Coyne, Archbishop of Hartford (ordained 1986)
- Philip Hannan, Archbishop of New Orleans (ordained 1939)
- Bernard Hebda, Archbishop of St. Paul and Minneapolis (ordained 1989)
- John Myers, Archbishop of Newark and Ecclesiastical Superior of Turks and Caicos (ordained 1966)
- John Nienstedt, Archbishop of St. Paul and Minneapolis (ordained 1974)
- J. Peter Sartain, Archbishop of Seattle (ordained 1978)
- John Vlazny, Archbishop of Portland in Oregon (ordained 1961)
- Peter Wells, Titular Archbishop of Marcianopolis and Apostolic Nuncio to South Africa and Botswana (ordained 1991)

== Bishops ==
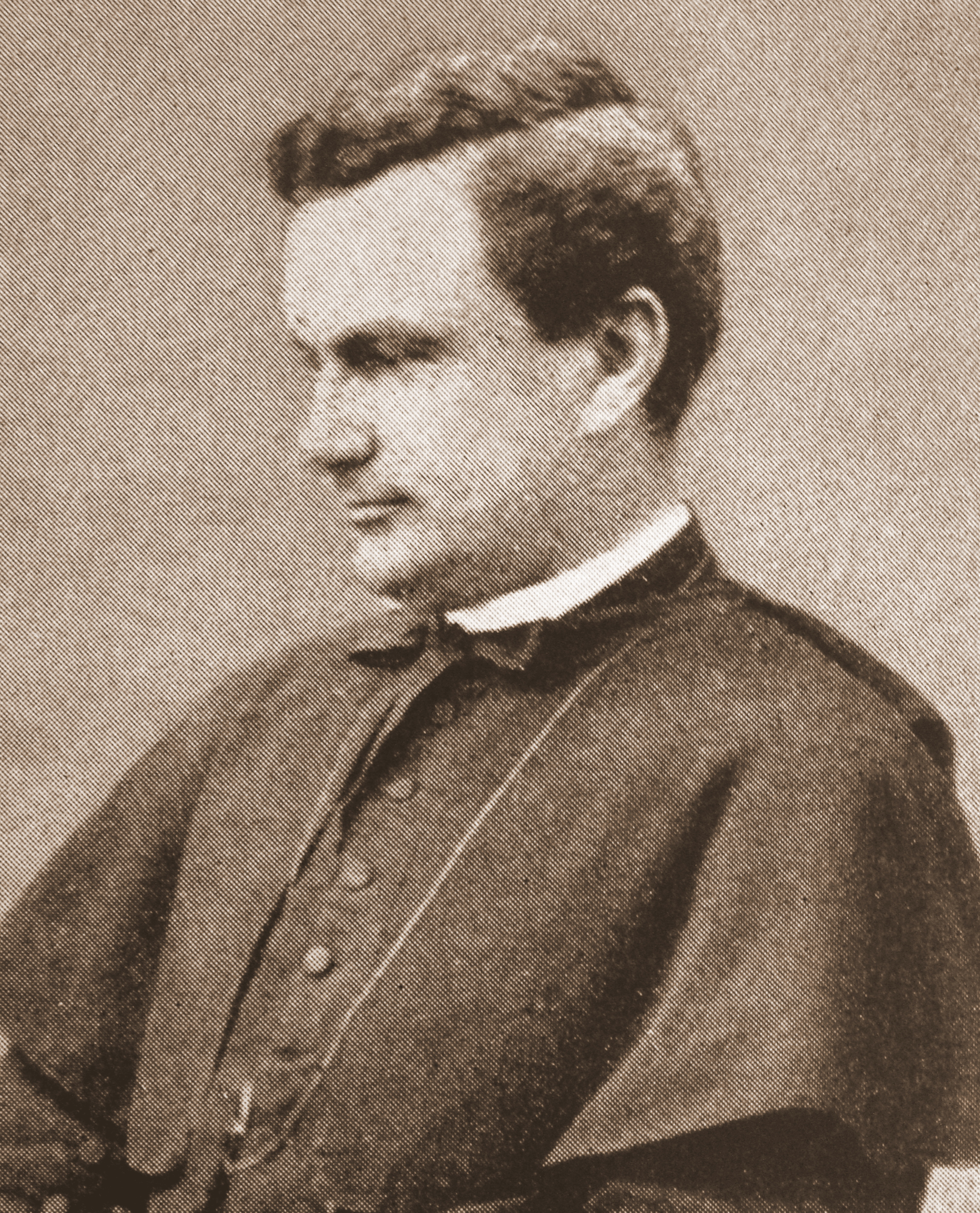
Denis O'Connell was ordained in Rome in 1877; afterwards he served as the American College's rector from 1885 to 1895, and would later go on to become the seventh bishop of Richmond, Virginia.

- J. Kevin Boland, Bishop of Savannah (ICTE program, 1974)
- Earl Boyea, Bishop of Lansing (ordained 1978)
- Lawrence Brandt, Bishop of Greensburg (ordained 1969)
- Fabian Bruskewitz, Bishop of Lincoln (ordained 1960)
- Scott E. Bullock, Bishop of Rapid City (ordained 1991)
- Liam Cary, Bishop of Baker (ordained 1992)
- James Checchio, Bishop of Metuchen (ordained 1992)
- Matthew Clark, Bishop of Rochester (ordained 1962)
- Paul Coakley, Bishop of Oklahoma City (licentiate, 1987)
- Joseph Corrigan, Rector of The Catholic University of America (ordained 1903)
- Robert Deeley, Bishop of Portland in Maine (ordained 1973)
- Frank Dewane, Bishop of Venice in Florida (ordained 1988)
- Maurice Dingman, Bishop of Des Moines (ordained 1939)
- Felipe de Jesús Estévez, Bishop of St. Augustine (doctorate, 1980)
- Robert Finn, Bishop of Kansas City-St. Joseph (ordained 1979)
- Bernard Flanagan, Bishop of Worcester (ordained 1931)
- Robert H. Flock, Bishop of San Ignacio de Velasco, Bolivia (ordained 1982)
- Daniel Flores, Bishop of Brownsville (doctorate, 2000)
- Victor Galeone, Bishop of St. Augustine (ordained 1960)
- Robert Gruss, Bishop of Rapid City (ordained 1994)
- Joseph Hanefeldt, Bishop of Grand Island (ordained 1984)
- Ralph Hayes, Bishop of Davenport (ordained 1909)
- Michael Hoeppner, Bishop of Crookston (ordained 1975)
- Howard Hubbard, Bishop of Albany (ordained 1963)
- Peter Jugis, Bishop of Charlotte (ordained 1983)
- Steven Lopes, Bishop of the Personal Ordinariate of the Chair of Saint Peter (ordained 2001)
- David Malloy, Bishop of Rockford (ordained 1983)
- John Marshall, Bishop of Springfield in Massachusetts (ordained 1953)
- Jeffrey Monforton, Bishop of Steubenville (ordained 1994)
- John Baptist Morris, Bishop of Little Rock (ordained 1892)
- Michael Mulhall, Bishop of Pembroke (ordained 1989)
- William Murphy, Bishop of Saginaw (ordained 1908)
- Denis O'Connell, Bishop of Richmond (ordained 1877)
- Gregory Parkes, Bishop of Pensacola-Tallahassee (ordained 1999)
- Edward Rice, Bishop of Springfield-Cape Girardeau (ordained 1987)
- Edward Scharfenberger, Bishop of Albany (ordained 1973)
- Michael Sis, Bishop of San Angelo (ordained 1986)
- Anthony Taylor, Bishop of Little Rock (ordained 1980)
- Robert Vasa, Bishop of Santa Rosa (licentiate, 1981)
- Joe Vásquez, Bishop of Austin (ordained 1984)
- Austin Vetter, Bishop of Helena (ordained 1992)

== Auxiliary bishops ==
- Cletus Benjamin, Auxiliary Bishop of Philadelphia (ordained 1935)
- Walter Edyvean, Auxiliary Bishop of Boston (ordained 1964)
- Gregory W. Gordon, Auxiliary Bishop of Las Vegas (ordained 1988)
- Arthur Kennedy, Auxiliary Bishop of Boston (ordained 1966)
- Edward McManaman, Auxiliary Bishop of Erie (ordained 1927)
- Robert P. Reed, Auxiliary Bishop of Boston (ordained 1985)
- William Waltersheid, Auxiliary Bishop of Pittsburgh (ordained 1992)
- John S. Bonnici, Auxiliary Bishop - Elect of New York (ordained 1991)

== Other clergy ==
- Philip Gordon, priest of the Diocese of Superior (ordained 1913)
- Peter Harman, priest of the Diocese of Springfield in Illinois (ordained 1999)
- Rob Keighron, former priest of the Diocese of Brooklyn
- Kevin McCoy, priest of the Diocese of Sioux City (ordained 1981)
- Charles Murphy, priest of the Diocese of Portland in Maine
- Augustine Schulte, priest of the Diocese of Philadelphia (ordained 1882)
- Peter Vaghi, priest of the Archdiocese of Washington, D.C. (ordained 1985)
