= Thomas Joseph Shahan =

American Catholic theologian, bishop and educator (1857–1932)

His Excellency, The Right Reverend Thomas J. Shahan
- Rector of CUA; Auxiliary bishop of Baltimore
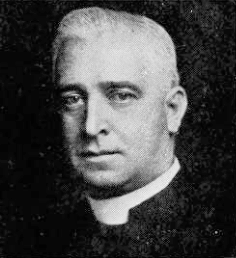
- Shahan in 1917
- Church: Roman Catholic
- Archdiocese: Roman Catholic Archdiocese of Baltimore
- See: Germanicopolis
- Predecessor: Joseph Maria Koudelka

Orders
- Ordination: June 3, 1882
- Consecration: November 15, 1914

Personal details
- Born: September 11, 1857 Manchester, New Hampshire, U.S.
- Died: March 9, 1932 (aged 74) Washington, D.C., U.S.
- Buried: Basilica of the National Shrine of the Immaculate Conception
- Occupation: Church historian
- Education: The North American College, Rome; Pontifical Roman Seminary; University of Berlin
- Motto: Spes mea Christus (Christ is my hope)

Thomas Joseph Shahan (September 11, 1857 – March 9, 1932) was an American Catholic prelate who served as an auxiliary bishop for the Archdiocese of Baltimore from 1914 to 1932. He also served as the fourth rector of the Catholic University of America (CUA) in Washington, D.C., and was instrumental in the creation of the National Catholic War Council in 1917 and the Basilica of the National Shrine of the Immaculate Conception.

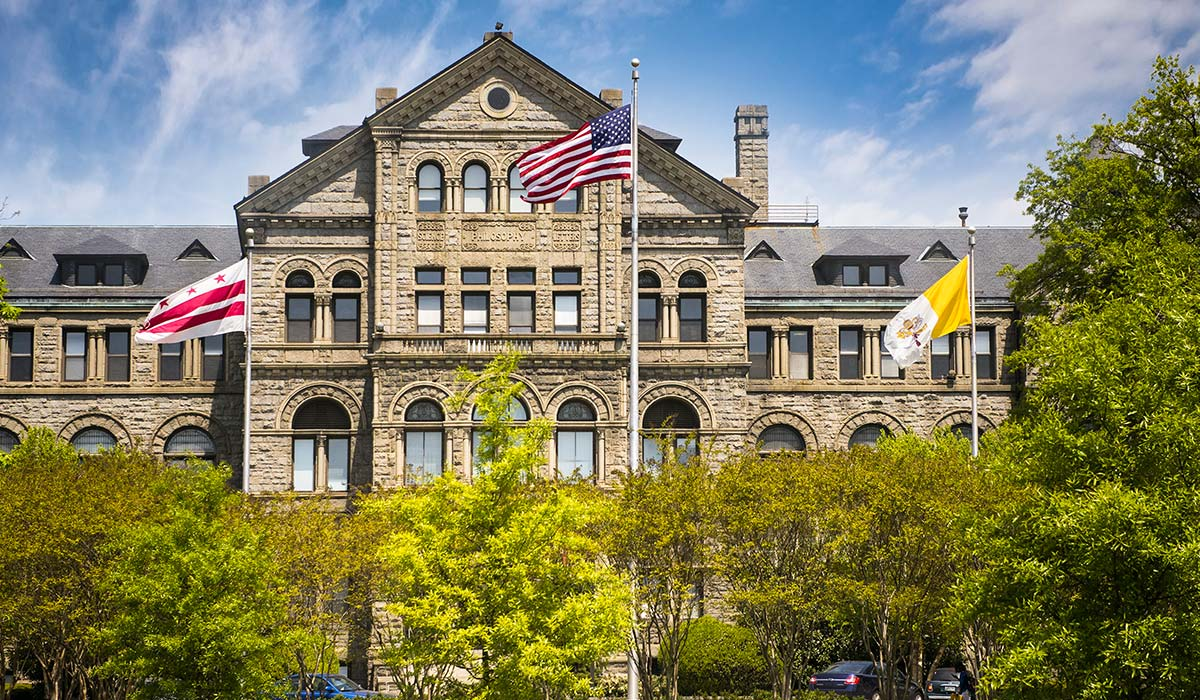
Catholic University of America, Washington, D.C. (2019)

== Early life and education ==
Thomas Shahan was born in Manchester, New Hampshire, on September 11, 1857, the son of Irish immigrants Maurice and Mary Anne Carmody Shahan. His mother was mentally disabled, resulting in Thomas being raised by his father and grandmother. He was an advocate for Irish independence in language, culture, and politics.

After attending public school in Millbury, Massachusetts, Shahan decided to study for the priesthood. He entered the Saint-Sulpice Seminary in Montreal, Quebec, in 1872. He was then sent to Rome in 1878 to reside at the Pontifical North American College during his studies there. In 1882, Shahan obtained a Doctor of Divinity decree.

== Priesthood ==
=== Ordination ===
Shahan was ordained a priest on June 3, 1882, in Rome by Cardinal Raffaele Monaco La Valletta for the Archdiocese of Hartford. After his ordination, the archdiocese assigned Shahan as a curate at St. John the Baptist Parish in New Haven, Connecticut. Bishop Lawrence McMahon later appointed Shahan as his secretary and then as chancellor of the diocese.

Shahan in 1889 went to Germany to study at the Humboldt University of Berlin. He then went to the Sorbonne University in Paris and the Institut Catholique de Paris. He would earn a Doctor of Theology degrees along with a Civil and Ecclesiastical Law Licentiate.

=== Teacher ===
In 1891, Shahan was offered a position as a professor of canon law, civil law and patristics at CUA. He also served as editor-in-chief of the Catholic University Bulletin and lectured at Trinity College in Washington In an effort to gain more visibility for CUA, in 1897, Shahan preached the Lenten Series at St. Patrick's Cathedral in New York City.

Shahan worked as an editor of the Catholic Encyclopedia in 1913 and as editor-in-chief of The Catholic Historical Review. He also participated as an editor of Universal Knowledge: A Dictionary and Encyclopedia of Arts and Sciences, History and Biography, Law, Literature, Religions, Nations, Races, Customs and Institutions (New York: Universal Knowledge Foundation, 1927). Shahan was a strong proponent of Irish independence, frequently writing about alleged British atrocities in Ireland.

== Rector of Catholic University of America ==
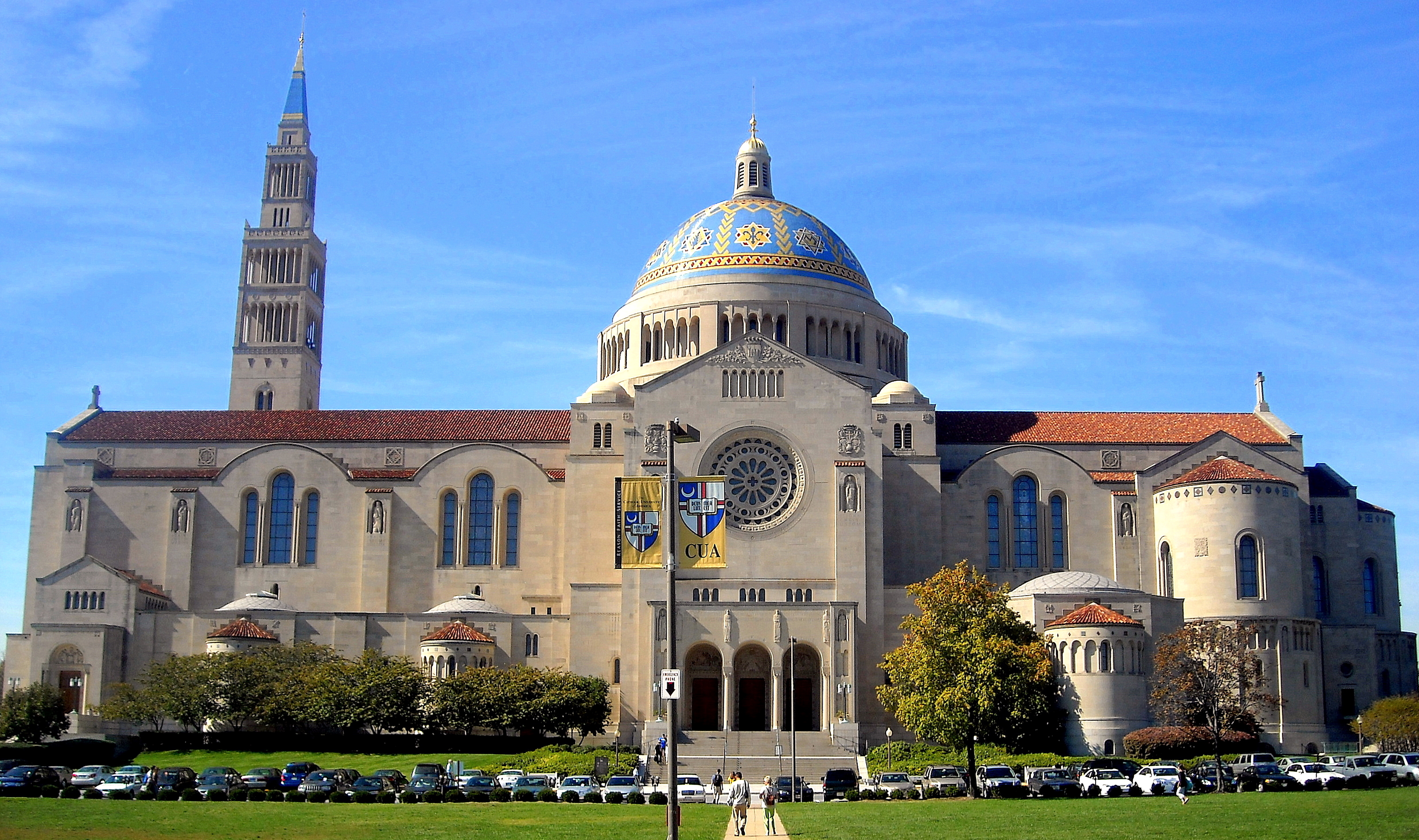
Basilica of the National Shrine of the Immaculate Conception, Washington, D.C. (2008)

Shahan had been among those considered for the position of rector as far back as 1902. In 1909, while Professor of Church History, he was appointed rector, when Pope Pius X declined to release Bishop John Patrick Carroll of the Diocese of Helena, Montana from his see. Some in the academic community raised objections to the appointment based in part on Shahan's seriously impaired hearing. Nonetheless, Shahan was elected as the fourth rector of CUA.

Shahan was a strong proponent of Irish independence, frequently writing about British atrocities in Ireland.

The Vatican named Shahan as a domestic prelate in 1909. Shahan also served as president of the Catholic Educational Association from 1909 to 1914. In 1910, Shahan first proposed the idea of a shrine to the Virgin Mary in Washington D.C. On a trip to Rome in 1913, he proposed the idea to Pope Pius X, who readily agreed.

On September 25, 1910, Shahan invited representatives of several national Catholic service agencies to meet at the CUA. During that meeting, they formed the National Conference of Catholic Charities (NCCC) to support and coordinate their charitable efforts. He served as the first NCCC president from 1910 to 1914.

== Auxiliary Bishop of Baltimore ==
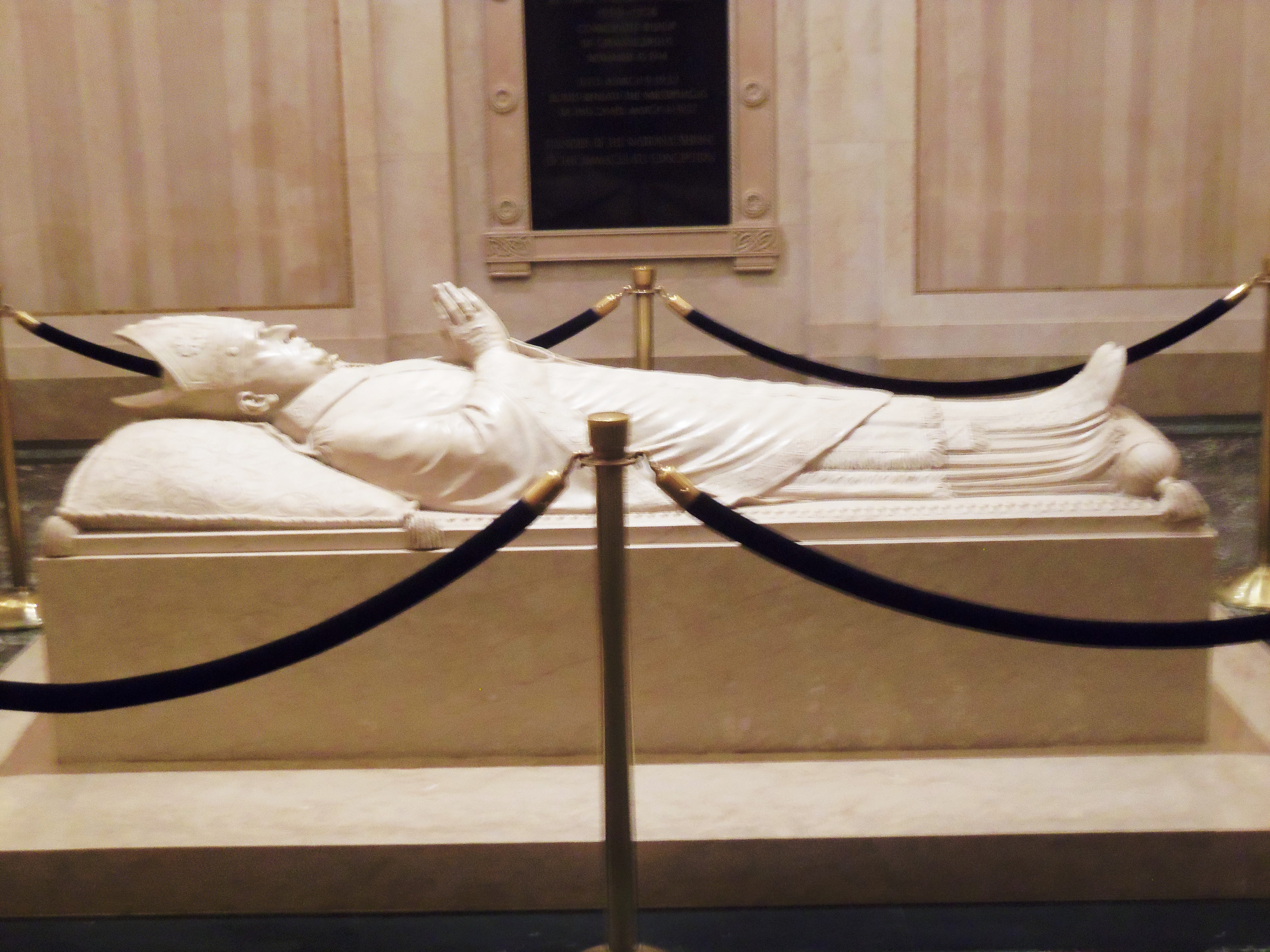
Tomb of Bishop Shahan, Basilica of the National Shrine of the Immaculate Conception, Washington, D.C. (2013)

On July 24, 1914, Pius X appointed Shahan as an auxiliary bishop of Baltimore and titular bishop of Germanicopolis. He was consecrated on November 15, 1914, at the Shrine of the Assumption of the Blessed Virgin Mary in Baltimore. Cardinal James Gibbons was principal consecrator.

CUA in 1914 denied Charles H. Wesley, a graduate of Howard University in Washington, from pursuing graduate studies at the university because he was African-American. CUA instituted a total ban on African-American students in 1919.

Along with CUA sociology professor William J. Kerby and others, Shahan was instrumental in the creation in 1917 of the National Catholic War Council. It was formed to coordinate the assignment of Catholic chaplains to American military units during World War I. In 1919, it evolved into the National Catholic Welfare Council and is now the United States Conference of Catholic Bishops (USCCB). Delayed by World War I, construction on the Shrine of the Immaculate Conception began in Washington in 1920. The crypt level of the shrine was completed in 1931.

== Death ==
Shahan died of a heart attack in Washington on March 9, 1932. He was interred in the crypt of the Shrine of the Immaculate Conception. To this day, he remains the only person interred at the Basilica.

== Honors ==
- 1923: Honorary doctorate – The Catholic University of Louvain, Leuven, Belgium
- 1926: Fellow – Medieval Academy of America, Cambridge, Massachusetts
- 1928: Honorary doctorate – Georgetown University, Washington, D.C.

== Published works ==
=== As author ===
- The Blessed Virgin in the Catacombs (1892)
- The Civil Law of Rome Catholic University of America Press (1896)
- Giovanni Batista de Rossi (1900)
- The Beginnings of Christianity (1903)
- The Middle Ages (1904)
- The House of God and Other Addresses and Studies (1905)
- St. Patrick in History (1905)
- The Catholic University of America (1889-1916) (Paulist Press) (1916)
- "The Cause of Ireland", The Catholic University Bulletin, December 1920.

=== As translator ===
- Otto Bardenhewer, Patrology: The Lives and Works of the Fathers of the Church; translated from the second edition by Thomas J. Shahan. Freiburg im Breisgau and St. Louis, Missouri: B. Herder, 1908.

Academic offices
Preceded by Denis J. O'Connell	Rector of CUA; 1909–1927	Succeeded by James Hugh Ryan
