= Kevin McCoy =

Kevin McCoy may refer to:

- Kevin M. McCoy, Vice Admiral in the United States Navy and commander of Naval Sea Systems Command
- Kevin McCoy (priest) (born 1954), American Roman Catholic priest and rector of the Pontifical North American College
- Kevin McCoy (artist), New York City artist
