= Harold P. Darcy =

American Catholic priest (1929–1997)

Harold P. Darcy (July 10, 1929 – December 23, 1997) was an American Roman Catholic priest who served as the rector of the Pontifical North American College in Rome from 1974 to 1979. Monsignor Darcy was a priest of the Archdiocese of Newark, New Jersey.

== Biography ==
Harold P. Darcy was born in Newark, New Jersey on July 10, 1929.

Prior to his service as rector of the Pontifical North American College, Monsignor Darcy was rector of Immaculate Conception Seminary at Seton Hall University from 1972 to 1974.

Darcy died in South Orange, New Jersey on December 23, 1997, at the age of 68.

Catholic Church titles
Preceded by James A. Hickey	Rector of the North American College, Rome; 1974–1979	Succeeded by Charles M. Murphy
