= Villa Gabrielli =

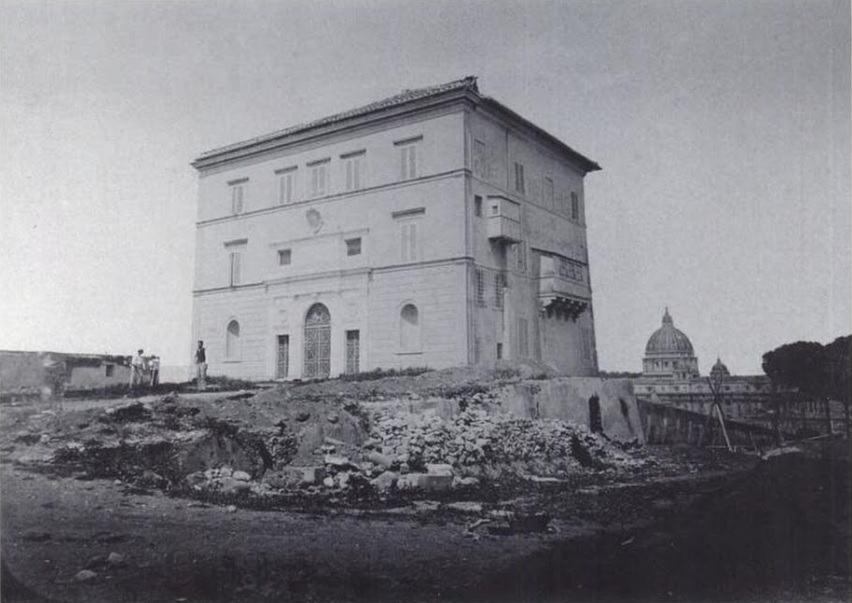
The casino of Villa Gabrielli, pictured in 1878.

Villa Gabrielli was an urban villa in Rome. It once comprised a large plot of land on the northernmost part of the Janiculum, just west of the Tiber. Today its land has been divided among the present campuses of the Pontifical North American College and the Pontifical Urban University. The construction of various buildings from 1869 until the present day has significantly altered the original layout of the villa's park, which survived largely intact into the twentieth century.

== History ==
=== Origin and development ===
Originally, the large villa occupied almost the entire northern portion of the Janiculum. Gardens and orchards already existed on the site before the property acquired a unitary character. This occurred towards the end of the eighteenth century, when Prince Pietro Gabrielli of Prossedi (1747–1824) hired the architect Francesco Rust to restore the casino (villa house) and design its surrounding park. The latter, known for its size and beauty, was a frequent destination on the Grand Tour because it enjoyed an unblocked panorama of the whole city and had a particularly scenic view of the dome of St. Peter's. The villa's pine-lined avenue, a remnant of a former Baroque garden, was particularly famous. It was these pines which may have inspired the third movement of Ottorino Respighi's tone poem Pines of Rome, which is entitled The Pines of the Janiculum (Pini del Gianicolo).

The period of the villa's greatest beauty and prominence was between 1820 and 1840, when Charlotte Bonaparte Gabrielli was in residence there. Some decadence had already begun in 1849 when the villa became the scene of harsh battles during the siege that ended the Roman Republic. In 1869, by the personal wish of Pope Pius IX, the villa was acquired by the papal administration from the Gabrielli family in order to expand the neighboring asylum of Santa Maria della Pietà. The casino was thus restructured and expanded, and used to accommodate wealthy male retirees.

During the unification of Italy and Papal Rome's fall to Italian republican forces in 1870, the villa became the property of the Provincial Administration of Rome. Over time, other buildings were progressively built into lower-lying areas of the villa's park. In 1913, the asylum was transferred to property outside the city of Rome, and the villa was abandoned.

=== Division of property ===
In 1925, partly thanks to a public fundraiser promoted by the Catholic bishops of the United States, the villa was jointly acquired for 40 million lire by the Congregation of the Propaganda Fide and the Pontifical North American College in order to establish new campuses for their institutions.

The northern part of the villa was assigned to the Propaganda Fide, and work was immediately begun on the buildings of the Urban College and Urban University, which were designed by the architects Carlo and Clemente Busiri Vici. Work lasted from 1928 until 1933.

The more southerly part of the villa was assigned to the Pontifical North American College, which did not immediately begin the construction of any new buildings. The former villa's casino at the southern end of the property was renamed Casa San Giovanni and used to house studying priests and resident American scholars visiting Rome. During World War II, the Casa S. Giovanni continued to house American priests in the service of the Vatican City, while the main campus of the North American College, Casa Santa Maria, was temporarily converted into an orphan asylum. After the end of the war, it was decided to transfer the principal activities of the Pontifical North American College to the Villa Gabrielli site. On October 14, 1953, Pope Pius XII solemnly dedicated the North American College's current buildings on the Janiculum.

=== Today ===
The villa's casino, heavily altered from its original structure, was rededicated in a 2010 renovation that renamed the building Casa O'Toole. It currently serves as a residence for priests on a sabbatical with the North American College's Institute for Continuing Theological Education.

With the signing of the Lateran Treaty in 1929, the entire territory of the villa was included among the extraterritorial property of the Holy See, a situation that persists today.
