= Louis Hostlot =

American Catholic priest

Louis Edward Hostlot
- Rector of the American College in Rome (1878–1884)
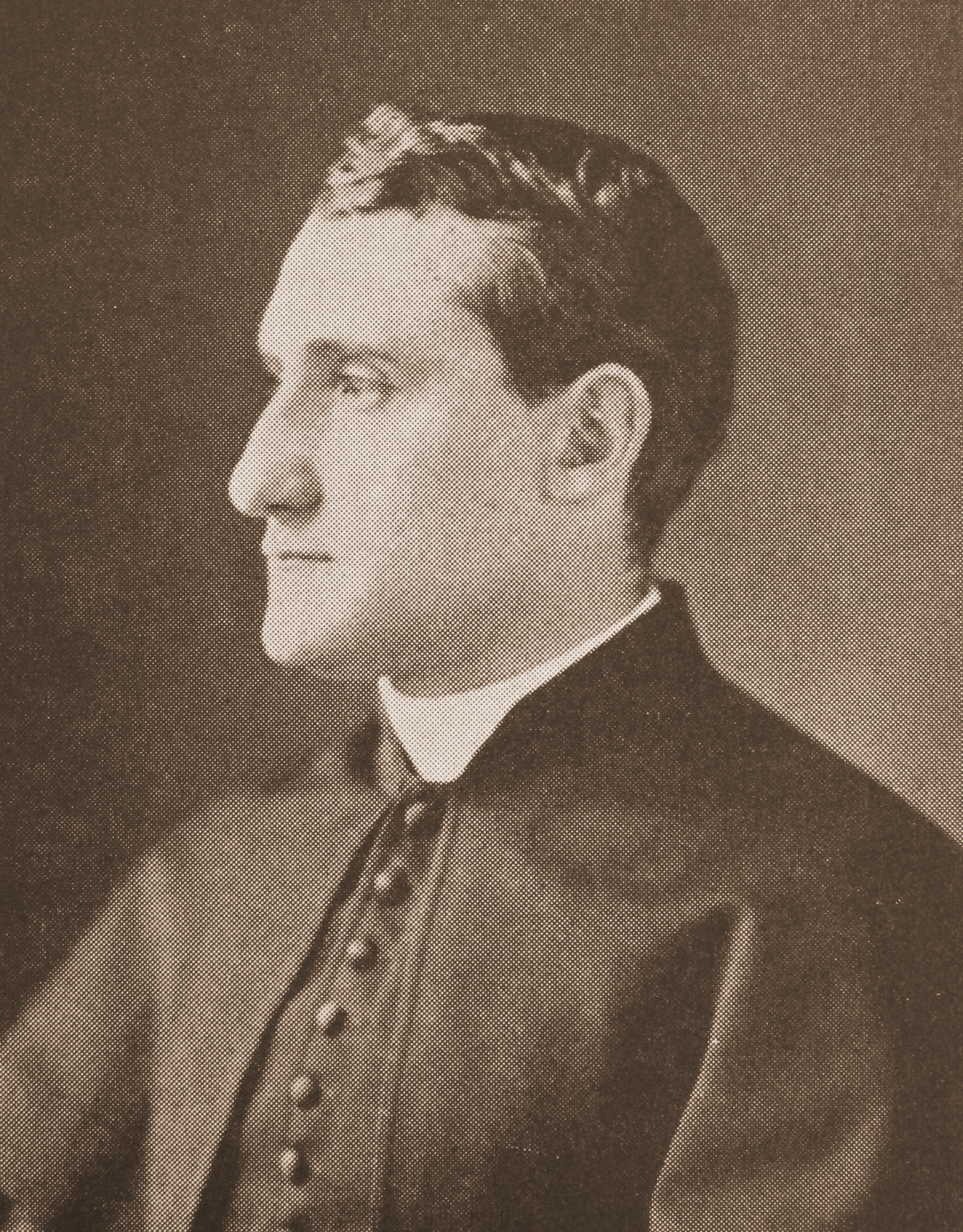

Orders
- Ordination: June 7, 1873

Personal details
- Born: November 18, 1848 Bedford, Brooklyn, New York, United States
- Died: February 1, 1884 (aged 35) Rome, Papal States
- Buried: Campo Verano Cemetery, Rome

Louis Edward Hostlot (November 18, 1848 – February 1, 1884) was an American Catholic priest who served as the third rector of the Pontifical North American College in Rome from 1878 until his death in 1884.

== Background ==
Johann Ludwig Hasslocher was born in Bedford, Brooklyn, New York (now known as Bedford–Stuyvesant) on November 18, 1848. He was the son of German immigrants from Baden, Johann Baptiste Hasslocher and Franziska Bopp. As a child, he was sent to the parochial school of a French church in Manhattan, St. Vincent de Paul. The French teachers at the school found the name "Hasslocher" difficult to remember and pronounce, and altered it to "Hostlot." Upon the advice of the French pastor, the Hasslochers allowed their son to retain that spelling even after he finished at the school.

In June 1868, Hostlot finished at St. Francis Xavier College in Manhattan with highest honors. Desiring to enter the priesthood, he applied to the American College in Rome as a student of philosophy.

== Arrival in Rome ==
Hostlot arrived in Rome and formally enrolled in the American College there on October 27, 1868.

Hostlot was ordained to the priesthood early, on June 7, 1873. Afterward, while he was working on his doctorate, he was selected by the College's rector, Silas Chatard, to be his assistant. The prior vice-rector, Father Michael Mahoney, had died unexpectedly of a heart ailment at the young age of 25 in April 1874. Hostlot assumed the role of vice-rector on October 15, 1875. Two years later, his good work was evidenced by Chatard's praise of him to the Archbishop of New York, Michael Corrigan: "[he is] benemeritus for his labours, in that most thankless of all works, economizing."

== Rector of the North American College ==
In 1878, Silas Chatard was appointed as Bishop of Vincennes. Upon the departure of Chartard as the College's rector, Hostlot became pro-rector (that is, temporary administrator) of the American College. Although he was only 30 years of age, the officials of the Sacred Congregation considered him an able administrator and recommended him to the Pope for the rectorate. He was therefore formally appointed rector by Pope Leo XIII on December 9, 1878. He was subsequently made a supernumerary papal chamberlain in the beginning of 1879. During his term as rector, he was further promoted to the rank of domestic prelate with the title monsignor on December 17, 1883.

According to American College historian Robert McNamara, Hostlot did not depart dramatically from Chatard's policies as rector. He also found the College's finances in good condition, helped in part by a steady rise in student registration. Given the increase in available funds, he was able to undertake several projects to expand and improve the College's property holdings. The first was the construction of a mortuary chapel in Rome's Campo Verano cemetery. Chartard had obtained the plot in 1874, but it is unclear whether the structure was completed by the time that the matter fell into Hostlot's hands. What is known is that the debt was paid by March 1879, during Hostlot's tenure. Secondly, repairs and enhancements were completed in the College itself, redecorating the interior and opening arches into the garden, and appointing a new sacristy for the chapel. In addition to those substantial tasks, Hostlot also succeeded in freeing up space in the building for accommodations to house 30 additional students. Finally, he purchased a villa for the use of the American seminarians in 1882. That property, located in Grottaferrata a few miles outside of the city, would be used for the lodging and recreation of the students during the hot summer months in Rome.

The extent of his duties is adequately summed up by Hostlot himself, who wrote in a letter to his friend Father John Farley of New York in 1883:

Caro mio, if you knew how busy I am. I am the servant of all, Rector, Vice-Rector, Ecclesiastical Consul, Spedizioniere Apostolico, Mezzo-Cameriere di S. Santità for our Americans, Cicerone for our Rt. Rev. Prelates; as for Cicerone to the Catacombs &c., I have given Dr. Smith a special Brevet for that mission...

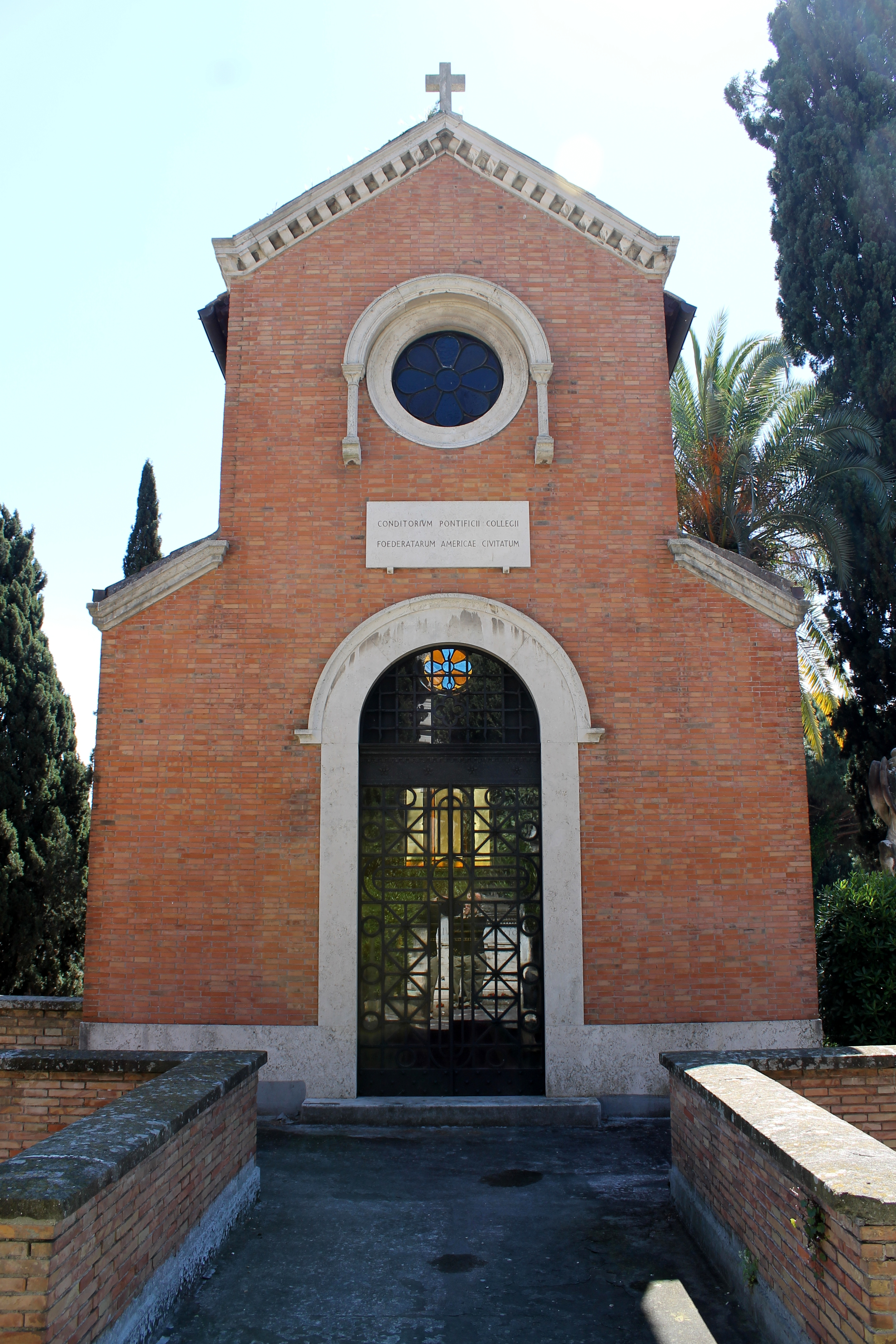
The North American College's mausoleum in the Campo Verano, which was constructed by the behest of Msgr. Hostlot's brother and sister in 1913.

Despite his accomplishments, students at the time generally judged that Monsignor Hostlot was rather harsh in his governance of the school. It was remembered by students that he had a somewhat idiosyncratic practice of singing to his own accompaniment in the College's drawing room. If the music was cheerful, he could be approached and asked for favors; if not, "we would not dare look toward the Sala windows." William Henry O'Connell, a student under Hostlot who would later go on to become rector of the College himself and eventually Cardinal Archbishop of Boston, remarked on the subject that "Poor Monsignor Hostlot meant well, but I know myself that he at the end regretted that he had held us off too far and was too much a martinet for a place like this." The result of that ill will from the student body reached a head in Hostlot's attempted dismissal of the College's vice-rector, Father Francis Wall, in 1880. The attempted move broke the College into both pro- and anti-Hostlot camps, leaving a division that persisted even beyond Hostlot's subsequent appointment a new vice-rector. When Wall's successor, Father Hugh McDevitt, refused to continue on as Hostlot's assistant, the College's board was forced to investigate the issue. The list of charges against Hostlot has not survived, but the outcome was in his favor: the rumors of professional or personal malpractice were found to be either untrue or insubstantial, and he was kept on as the College's rector. In 1883, he chose as his vice-rector Augustine J. Schulte, a student priest from Philadelphia.

== Death and legacy ==
By late 1883, however, Monsignor Hostlot's health took a turn for the worse. He became ill with a cold, which became so severe that by the day after Christmas 1883, he went to bed immediately after celebrating morning Mass. His ailment was probably influenza, which at that time was becoming epidemic in Rome. His doctors could not agree on a prognosis, with one suggesting that it was the green wallpaper of his bedroom that was causing his sickness. On January 31, 1884, he suffered a relapse that effectively eliminated any hope of recovery. That evening, he received Viaticum with devotion from the hands of the College's spiritual director, Ubaldo Ubaldi.

At daybreak on February 1, 1884, Hostlot died at the age of 35. Despite his somewhat tumultuous term as rector, his good character and generosity were remembered by the "relatively large crowd of mourners" that came to view his body laid in state in the College's church of Santa Maria dell'Umiltà. Afterwards, his remains were carried in procession to the nearby Basilica of the Holy Apostles. The celebrant of the funeral Mass was Domenico Jacobini, who was at that time Secretary of the Propaganda Fide. Hostlot was then buried at the College's new mortuary chapel in the Campo Verano.

Hostlot was very generous in his will to the American College. He had set aside $5,000 for the foundation of a new student scholarship, which was to be accredited specifically to the Archdiocese of New York. Moreover, he directed that the 12,000 lira debt owed to him by the College should be forgiven and used to pay off the remaining balance on the villa in Grottaferrata. Soon after his death, his family established another scholarship in his memory. Nearly twenty years after Hostlot's death, his brother, John Hasslocher, contributed $500 towards the College's purchase of a new wing to expand their campus near Piazza della Pilotta.

Finally, in 1913, John Hasslocher and his sister, Anna Ehret, financed the construction and adornment of the American College's current Romanesque mausoleum in Campo Verano. Upon the completion of that structure the remains of Monsignor Hostlot and most of the other deceased of the College were transferred to the new mausoleum, where they rest today. The following inscription was erected in the chapel to commemorate Louis Hostlot and record the funerary chapel's donation by his family:

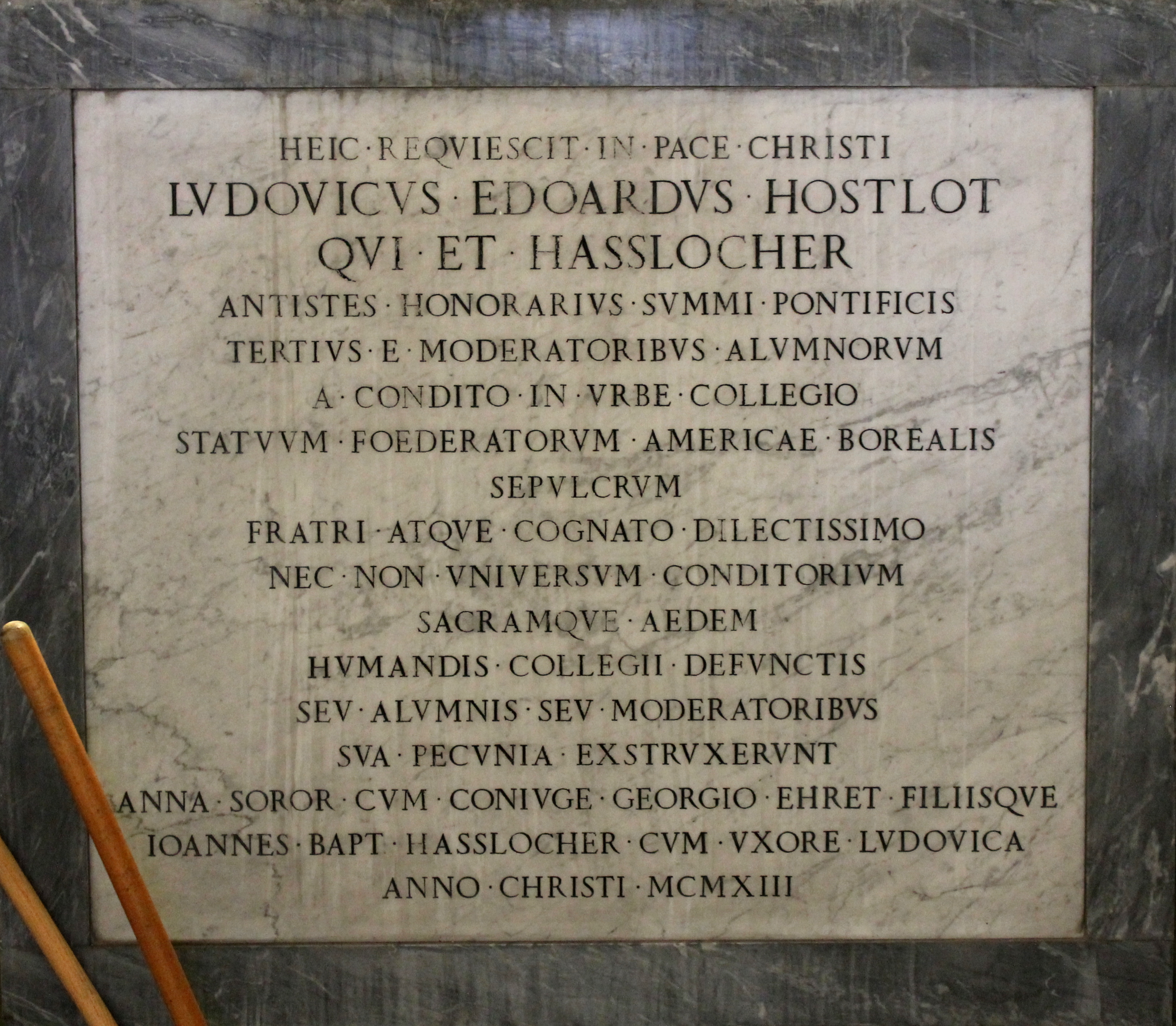
The inscription commemorating Hostlot

HEIC REQVIESCIT IN PACE CHRISTI

LVDOVICVS EDOARDVS HOSTLOT
QVI ET HASSLOCHER
ANTISTES HONORARIVS SVMMI PONTIFICIS
TERTIVS E MODERATORBIVS ALVMNORVM
A CONDITO IN VRBE COLLEGIO
STATVVM FOEDERATORVM AMERICAE BOREALIS
SEPVLCRVM
FRATRI ATQVE COGNATO DILECTISSIMO
NEC NON VNIVERSVM CONDITORIVM
SACRAMQVE AEDEM
HVMANDIS COLLEGII DEFVNCTIS
SEV ALVMNIS SEV MODERATORIBVS
SVA PECVNIA EXSTRVXERVNT
ANNA SOROR CVM CONIVNGE GEORGIO EHRET FILIISQVE
IOANNES BAPT HASSLOCHER CVM VXORE LVDOVICA

ANNO CHRISTI MCMXIII (Note: The Latin inscription, which is found on the back of the funerary chapel's altar, can be translated: "Here rests in the peace of Christ Louis Edward Hostlot (who is also named Hasslocher): honorary prelate of the Supreme Pontiff, the third rector of the students of the North American College in Rome since its founding. The tomb of their much beloved brother and kinsman—and indeed the whole mausoleum and chapel for the interment of the deceased of the College, both students and faculty—was erected with funds from his sister Anna, her husband George Ehret and their children, and John Baptist Hasslocher and his wife Eliza, in the year of Christ, 1913.")

== References and notes ==
Notes

Works cited

- McNamara, Robert F. (1956), The American College in Rome, 1855–1955, Rochester, N.Y.: The Christopher Press, LCCN 56007591
- Brann, Henry A. (1910), History of the American College of the Roman Catholic Church of the United States, Rome, Italy, New York: Benziger Brothers
