= Augustine Schulte =

American Catholic priest (1856–1937)

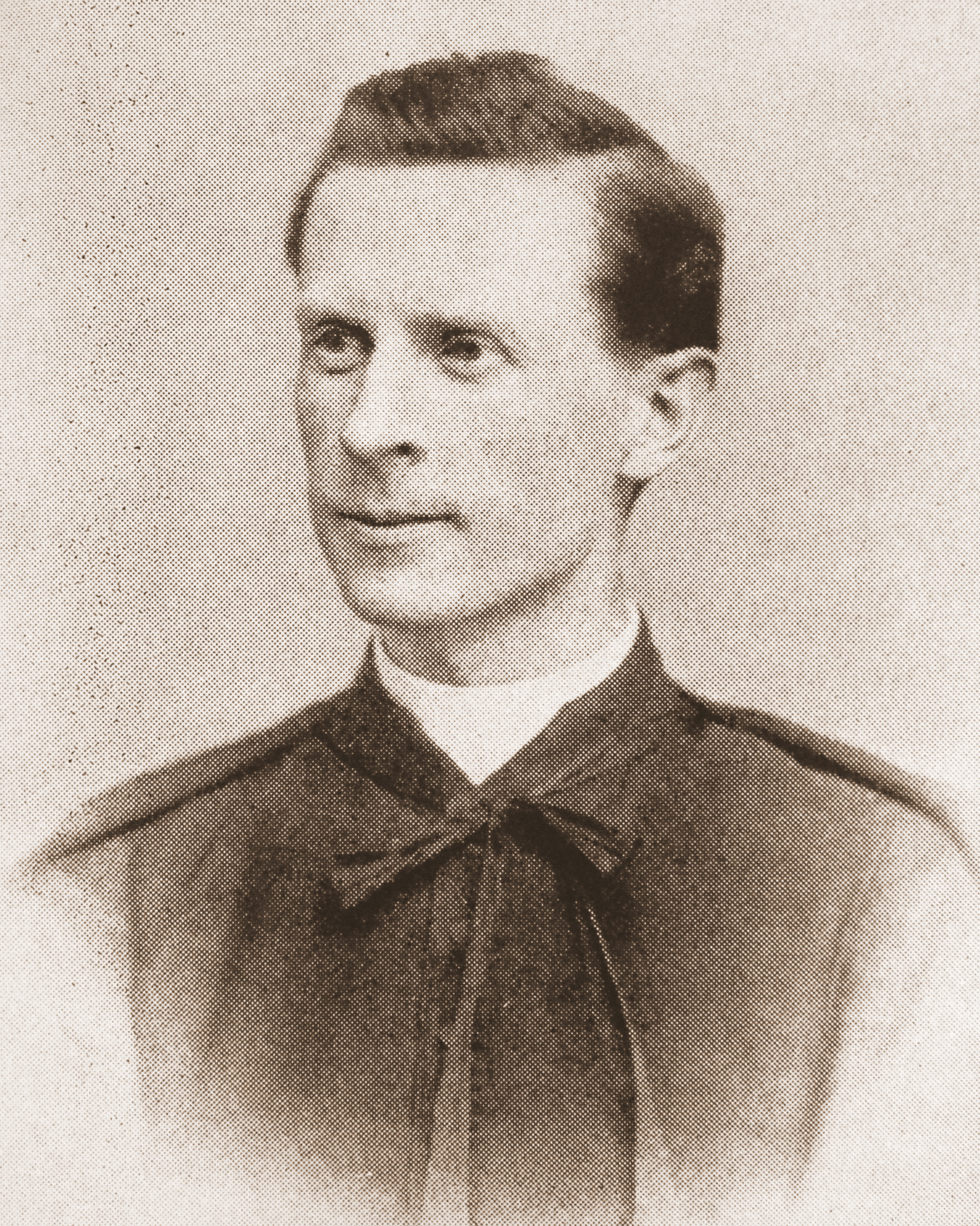
- Born: May 5, 1856; Philadelphia, Pennsylvania, US
- Died: May 23, 1937 (aged 81); Philadelphia, Pennsylvania, US
- Known for: Pro-rector of the Pontifical North American College (1884–1885)
- Notable work: Benedicenda (1907); Consecranda (1907)

Augustine Joseph Schulte (May 5, 1856 – May 23, 1937) was an American Catholic priest and professor at St. Charles Borromeo Seminary in Pennsylvania, who served as the interim rector of the Pontifical North American College in Rome from 1884 to 1885.

== Early life ==
Augustine Joseph Schulte was born on May 5, 1856, in Philadelphia, to Augustine and Louise Bille Schulte. He was educated at the parochial school of St. Peter Church in Philadelphia from 1863 until 1869 before entering St. Charles Borromeo Seminary in Overbrook. He studied there from 1874 to 1879.

== Education and service in Rome ==
He entered the North American College in Rome as a student on August 23, 1879. He completed the course of study and was ordained a priest by Raffaele Cardinal Monaco La Valletta on June 3, 1882, at the Lateran Basilica in Rome.

He served as assistant to the American College's rector, Louis Hostlot, starting on June 1, 1883. When Hostlot died at the age of 35 on February 1, 1884, Schulte was still serving in the role as his assistant. The College's executive committee of bishops met in New York on March 12, 1884, at the residence of Cardinal McCloskey to consider names for the vacant rectorship; at that time, three names were put forward, including that of Denis J. O'Connell, who would later be selected for the position. Yet, because Father Schulte's service "gave such great satisfaction to his ecclesiastical superiors in Rome," Cardinal Simeoni, the College's Cardinal Protector, did not accept any of the candidates at that time. Instead, he suggested that Schulte continue to serve as the administrator of the College on a trial basis. Although the committee was a bit surprised at the suggestion, they agreed and the Cardinal was notified of the decision on May 9, 1884. Schulte was not the most likely candidate for rector, as he was only 28 years old at the time, and of a "fair complexion and slight, wiry build which made him look even younger."

Even so, Schulte served as a provisionary rector from 1884 to 1885. In the parlance of the seminary system of the time, he was styled pro-rector. While Schulte himself reckoned that his duties began on February 1, 1884, and precisely a year later in 1885, the technical term of service for which he was commissioned by the executive committee was from May 30, 1884, until June 15, 1885.

College historian Robert McNamara notes that Schulte seems to have had little problem in commanding the respect of the students, despite his youth and lack of experience. He was quickly shouldered with responsibilities, of which a notable one was the College's silver jubilee in December 1884. To commemorate the occasion, Schulte was able to successfully arrange that the seminarians attend Pope Leo XIII's own private Mass in the Vatican and be received in a special audience afterwards.

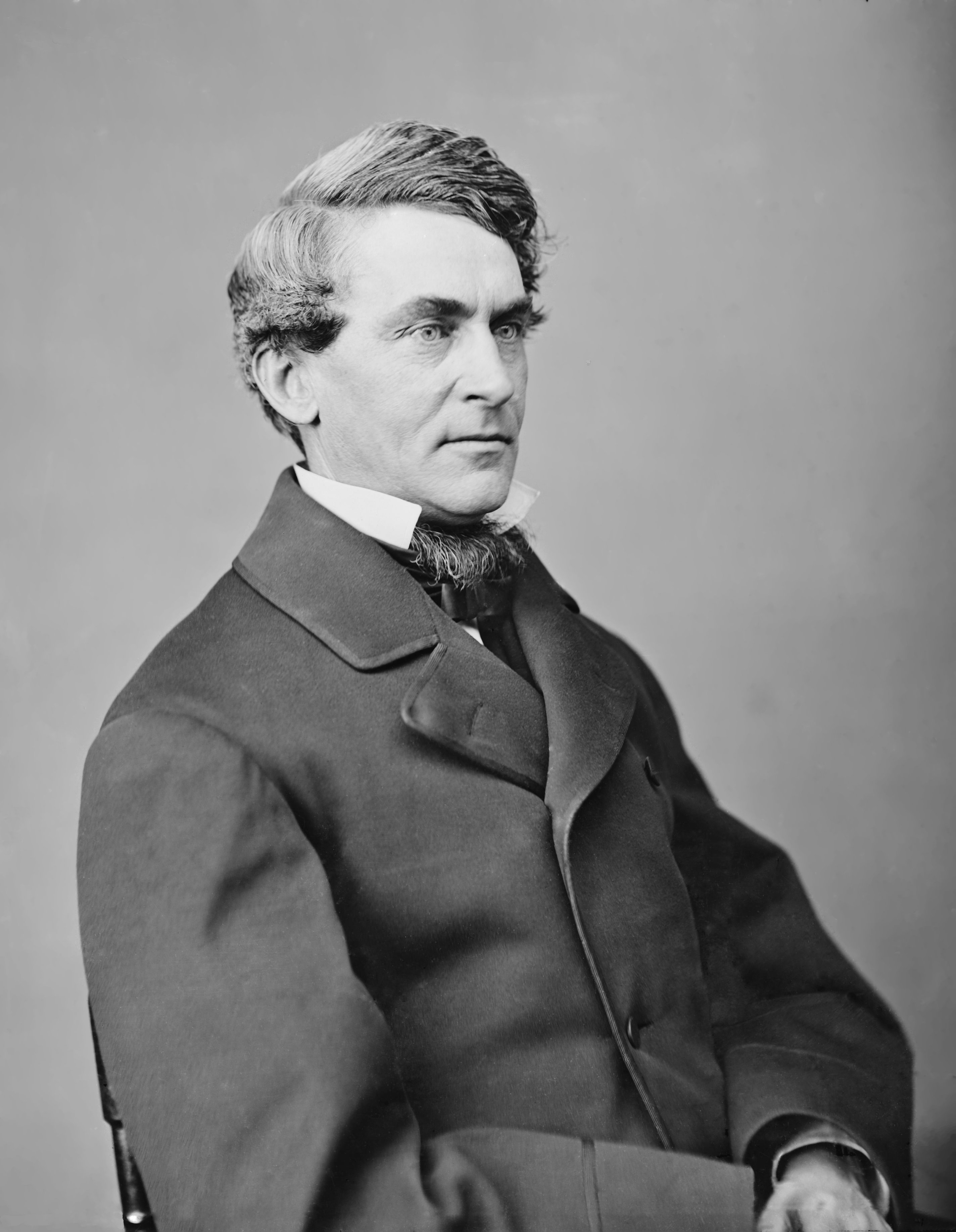
The intervention of the U.S. government, mediated by Secretary of State Frederick Frelinghuysen, saved the College from confiscation during Schulte's pro-rectorate and led to its canonical establishment in 1884

Much more significant, however, was the Kingdom of Italy's attempted confiscation of the American College's property in 1884. The Italian Supreme Court of Cassation ruled on January 29, 1884, that all of the Propaganda Fide's properties were to be confiscated and subject to conversion. The protest from the American Catholic hierarchy and laity was immediate and denunciations of the Italian government continued throughout winter and spring 1884. Indeed, the fear seemed to be well founded, as on February 27, Father Schulte learned that the sale of Propaganda real estate was about to begin, and the American College was first on the list. Schulte informed Cardinal Simeoni, who immediately cabled New York for assistance, while Schulte hung up an American flag over the College's doors in defiance.

The Archbishop of New York, Michael Corrigan, quickly sprung into action at the news. He was able to show the cablegram to his friend George Bliss, a prominent New York lawyer. A string of contacts over the following day succeeded in placing the matter before the President of the United States, Chester A. Arthur. That led to Secretary of State Frederick Frelinghuysen requesting that the Italian government halt proceedings against the College. Although the College did not, in fact, hold title to the structure, a loophole in the 1873 legislation that permitted the seizure—plus the pressure of the United States government—allowed the College to escape confiscation. With the College saved, Schulte was "justly proud of having been the first to raise the hue and cry."

The incident, however, led the College's board of governors to request that the College be incorporated as an institution foundationally distinct from the Propaganda's Urban College, of which until that point it had functioned as a sort of subsidiary. Pope Leo XIII replied with the Apostolic Brief Ubi primum of October 25, 1884, which decreed the canonical institution of the North American College and gave it the rank and title of a "pontifical" college.

In the end, the new canonical status of the College focused the attention of Cardinal Simeoni and the board of governors on finding a permanent rector. While Father Schulte had performed admirably in his provisionary role, he was ultimately deemed too young for the task, and his qualifications insufficient. Instead, Father Denis J. O'Connell was selected for the job and became the College's fourth rector by election of the Propaganda on June 8, 1885. Papal confirmation followed a few days later, and Schulte's brief but important term as pro-rector came to an end.

Unfortunately, however, the appointment of a new rector came as a shock to Schulte. He had been assured by Cardinal Gibbons at the beginning of his service: "You will in all probability, continue to act as Rector, and every day will be removing the youth, the only objection which exists against you." That promise, however, proved imprudent. He would later lament to Gibbons concerning his departure: "It is possibly providential, at least I should view it as such, but your Grace, knowing my love and affection for the College, will easily understand that it was by no means very agreeable."

== Later life ==
After leaving Rome in June 1885, Schulte was named professor of liturgy, Latin, and French at his alma mater, St. Charles Borromeo Seminary in Overbrook. He began that assignment on September 8, 1885. He served as master of discipline there from September 1886 until February 1898, and in addition to that responsibility, bursar of the seminary from 1886 to 1908. On November 10, 1885, he enrolled as a charter member of the North American College's alumni association.

Schulte was incapacitated by illness from 1927 onwards, and died on May 23, 1937, aged 81, in Philadelphia, while still in residence at St. Charles Borromeo Seminary, which is located in Lower Merion Township, Pennsylvania.

== Scholarship ==
Schulte was the author of two works on liturgy: Benedicenda (New York, 1907), and Consecranda (New York, 1907), which have been reprinted several times. He also wrote numerous articles on liturgical subjects for the Catholic Encyclopedia (New York: Robert Appleton Company, 1907–1914) and wrote for the American Ecclesiastical Review (Washington, D.C.) under the pseudonyms "S.L.E." and "S.L.T.

== References and notes ==
Works cited

- Brann, Henry A. (1910), History of the American College of the Roman Catholic Church of the United States, Rome, Italy, New York: Benziger Brothers
- McNamara, Robert F. (1956), The American College in Rome, 1855–1955, Rochester, N.Y.: The Christopher Press, LCCN 56007591
- The Catholic Encyclopedia and its Makers. The Encyclopedia Press. 1917 – via archive.org.
