= Denis J. O'Connell =

American Catholic bishop

The Most Reverend Denis J. O'Connell
- Bishop Emeritus of Richmond
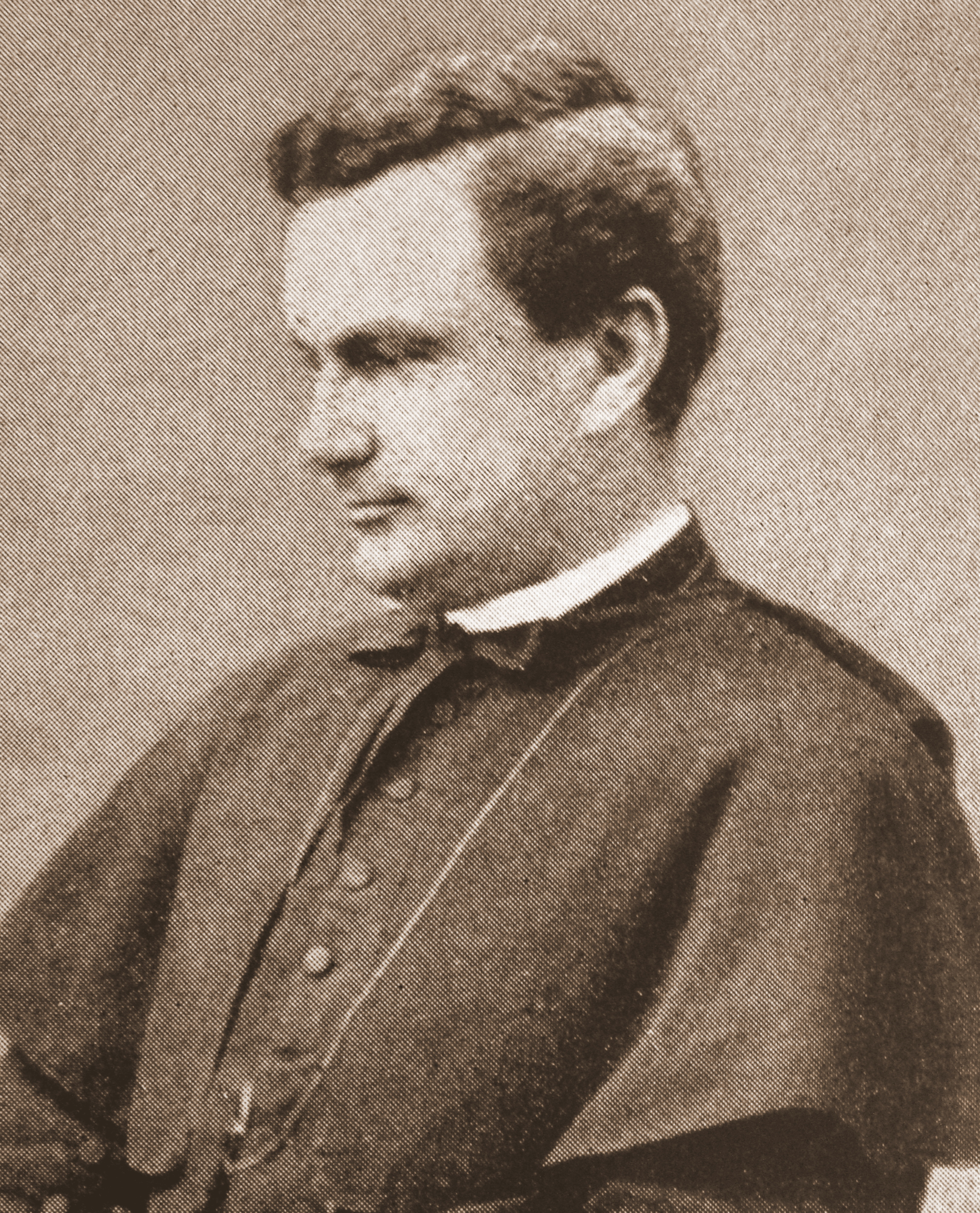
- O'Connell as rector of the North American College
- Church: Catholic Church
- Diocese: Richmond
- Appointed: January 19, 1912
- Retired: January 15, 1926
- Predecessor: Augustine Van de Vyver
- Successor: Andrew Brennan
- Other post: Titular Archbishop of Mariamme (1926–1927)
- Previous posts: Rector of the Pontifical North American College (1885–1895); Rector of the Catholic University of America (1903–1909); Titular Bishop of Sebaste (1908); Auxiliary Bishop of San Francisco (1908–1912)

Orders
- Ordination: May 26, 1877 by Raffaele Monaco La Valletta
- Consecration: May 3, 1908 by James Gibbons

Personal details
- Born: January 28, 1849 Donoughmore, County Cork, Ireland
- Died: January 1, 1927 (aged 77) Richmond, Virginia, U.S.
- Education: St. Charles College; Pontificio Collegio Urbano de Propaganda Fide
- Motto: Et juste et vray (Latin for 'Both just and true')

Denis Joseph O'Connell (January 28, 1849 – January 1, 1927) was an American Catholic bishop and academic administrator. He served as rector of the Pontifical North American College in Rome (1885–1895) and the Catholic University of America in Washington, D.C. (1903–1909). He later served as an auxiliary bishop of the Archdiocese of San Francisco (1908–1912) and Bishop of Richmond (1912–1926).

== Early life and education ==
A native of Ireland, Denis Joseph O'Connell was born on January 28, 1849, in Donoughmore, County Cork. He was the third of twelve children born to Michael and Bridget O'Connell. One brother, Patrick, later served in the South Carolina House of Representatives (1868–1872) and two sisters, Annie and Joanna, became members of the Sisters of Mercy and Daughters of Charity.

Sometime between 1852 and 1856, Michael O'Connell and his family immigrated to the United States, settling in Columbia, South Carolina. Three of Michael's brothers—Jeremiah, Joseph, and Lawrence—were missionary priests and had come to South Carolina several years earlier. Michael worked as a carpenter in Columbia and later served as a magistrate.

Denis received his early education at St. Mary's College, a boys' school which his uncle Jeremiah had founded in 1851. However, the school and the O'Connell home were destroyed during the capture of Columbia in February 1865. The O'Connell family then moved to Fort Mill, near Charlotte, North Carolina. Jeremiah would later play an instrumental role in the establishment of Belmont Abbey College, purchasing land for the Benedictines to start a new Catholic educational institution in the Carolinas.

In 1868, Denis enrolled at St. Charles College, a minor seminary in Ellicott City, Maryland. While there, he was recruited for the Apostolic Vicariate of North Carolina by its new bishop, James Gibbons. This was the beginning of an intimate and lifelong friendship between the two men, leading one journalist to describe them as "[Gibbons] and his Father Achates O'Connell." In 1872, after Gibbons became Bishop of Richmond, he sent O'Connell to continue his studies in Rome. O'Connell resided at the Pontifical North American College while taking courses at Pontificio Collegio Urbano de Propaganda Fide. According to Louis Hostlot, then vice-rector of the American College:

"Mr. O'Connell has given the greatest satisfaction during his course. His talent is remarkable. At his examination for the degree of D.D., his success has been so marked, that the degree was conferred on him by the Cardinal & professors with acclamation, they refusing to vote by ballot as is usual on such occasions."

== Priesthood ==
On May 26, 1877, O’Connell was ordained a priest in Rome by the Cardinal Vicar, Raffaele Monaco La Valletta. Upon his return to the United States, he was assigned to St. Peter's Cathedral in Richmond. When Gibbons became Archbishop of Baltimore in October 1877, O'Connell was sent to Rome to retrieve his pallium. O'Connell also served as secretary to George Michael Conroy, the Apostolic Delegate to Canada, during his tour of U.S. dioceses in 1878.

In 1883, O'Connell briefly served as pastor of Sacred Heart Church in Winchester before joining Gibbons in Baltimore to assist with preparations for the Third Plenary Council of Baltimore. During the council, his uncle Joseph O'Connell, then pastor of St. Michael's Church in Brooklyn, served as a theologian to Bishop John Loughlin. After the close of the council in December 1884, Denis was again sent to Rome to obtain approval of the council's documents from Pope Leo XIII.

=== Pontifical North American College ===
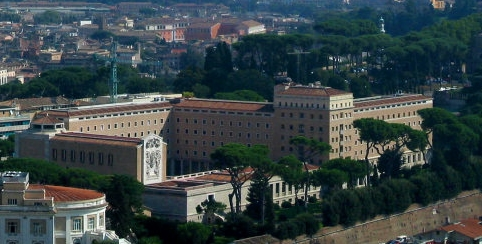
Pontifical North American College, Rome, Italy (2010)

Following the death of Louis Hostlot, the bishops on the Pontifical North American College's executive board submitted three names to Rome to succeed him as rector—O’Connell, interim rector Augustine Schulte, and William Kieran of Philadelphia. The Congregation for the Propagation of the Faith (which then oversaw the college) nominated O'Connell on June 8, 1885, and Leo XIII confirmed his appointment on the following June 15.

As rector, O'Connell promoted a greater sense of independence among the seminarians, allowing them to take summer trips to other European countries and the Holy Land. In addition to his administrative duties, he was tasked with obtaining papal audiences for American visitors and hosting American prelates who were visiting Rome. He also served as an unofficial agent of American bishops, representing their interests with Vatican officials. He became closely identified with the liberal faction of American bishops, led by Gibbons, Archbishop John Ireland, and Bishop John J. Keane.

On June 7, 1895, O'Connell submitted his resignation as rector (effective November 1) to Gibbons, as chairman of the American College's executive board. O'Connell cited poor health as his reason, but this was disputed by others. Salvatore Brandi, editor of La Civiltà Cattolica, claimed that Leo XIII had demanded O'Connell's resignation due to his frequent absences from Rome and his relationship with Virginia Scott MacTavish, a daughter of Charles MacTavish, "with whom the Rector has travelled very extensively and whom he has often visited at the Hotel." Canonist Richard Lalor Burtsell claimed that Leo XIII had become enraged when he learned O'Connell had repeated a rumor that Cardinal Francesco Satolli was the pope's illegitimate son. A biographer of Gibbons argued the principal reason was O'Connell's liberal views, which also led to the dismissal of Bishop Keane as rector of the Catholic University of America the following year.

Following his resignation from the American College, Gibbons kept O'Connell in Rome as vicar of his titular church, Santa Maria in Trastevere.

== Catholic University of America ==
On November 16, 1902, the Board of Trustees of the Catholic University of America submitted three names to Rome to serve as the institution's next rector—O'Connell, incumbent rector Thomas James Conaty, and professor Thomas Joseph Shahan. Shortly afterward, Conaty was appointed Bishop of Monterey–Los Angeles, clearing the way for O'Connell. On January 12, 1903, six months before his death, Leo XIII appointed O'Connell as rector. In a letter to Gibbons, Archbishop Ireland remarked, "What a revolution in the temper of Rome there is implied in his nomination!"

O'Connell was installed as the third rector of the Catholic University on April 22, 1903, marking the first time he had lived in the United States in nearly twenty years. The most pressing issue facing O’Connell's administration was the university’s finances; the school had $201,233 in debt but only $56,251 to meet its obligations. O'Connell successfully lobbied for a ten-year annual collection in all U.S. dioceses, which helped eliminate the university's debt by 1908. O'Connell also oversaw significant growth in the student body, rising from 91 in his first year to 224 in the 1907–1908 academic year. However, despite his success in finances and enrollment, O'Connell had a strained relationship with the faculty and rarely discussed policies with the academic senate.

Following the tradition of the previous two rectors, who were bishops, Pope Pius X appointed O'Connell to the honorary position of Titular Bishop of Sebaste on December 16, 1907. He received his episcopal consecration on May 3, 1908, from Gibbons at Baltimore's Assumption Cathedral, with Archbishop Henry K. Moeller and Bishop Henry P. Northrop serving as co-consecrators. He remained as rector of the Catholic University until the end of his term on January 11, 1909.

== Episcopal career ==
=== Auxiliary Bishop of San Francisco ===
After declining the request of Archbishop Patrick William Riordan to appoint Edward Joseph Hanna as a coadjutor bishop of the Archdiocese of San Francisco, Pius X instead named O'Connell an auxiliary bishop of San Francisco on December 25, 1908. O'Connell arrived in California in March 1909, but was given no administrative or pastoral role by Riordan. Describing his auxiliary's personality, the archbishop wrote, "He is too old to transplant or take root here, and he never liked this Western country. He was born in the South, and he has remained a Southern gentleman all through life, with Southern ways. This pushing life of ours is not in keeping with that temperament."

=== Bishop of Richmond ===
When Bishop Augustine Van de Vyver of Richmond died in October 1911, both the diocesan priests and the bishops of the Baltimore ecclesiastical province recommended the appointment of O'Connell to succeed him. On January 19, 1912, he was named the seventh bishop of the Diocese of Richmond—where he had begun his career as a priest. He was installed at St. Peter's Cathedral on the following March 19.

In the first full year of O'Connell's tenure in 1913, the diocese contained 83 churches, 61 priests, and 24 parochial schools to serve a Catholic population of 41,000. By O'Connell's final year as bishop in 1926, there were 44,000 Catholics, 110 churches, 105 priests, and 32 parochial schools.

== Retirement and death ==
In November 1925, Cardinal Gaetano de Lai of the Sacred Consistorial Congregation (now the Dicastery for Bishops) wrote to O'Connell to seek his retirement as Bishop of Richmond. O'Connell subsequently submitted his resignation, which was accepted by Pope Pius XI on January 15, 1926. At that time, the pope gave him the honorary position of Titular Archbishop of Mariamme.

O'Connell died in Richmond a year later, on January 1, 1927, at the age of 77.

Bishop Denis J. O'Connell High School in Arlington, Virginia, now part of the Diocese of Arlington, was named for him.

== Sources ==
- Fogarty, Gerald P. (1974). The Vatican and the Americanist Crisis: Denis J. O'Connell, American Agent in Rome, 1885-1903. Gregorian & Biblical Press. ISBN 9788876524578.

Academic offices
Preceded by Louis Hostlot	Rector of the Pontifical North American College; 1885–1895	Succeeded by William H. O'Connell
Preceded by Thomas J. Conaty	Rector of CUA; 1903–1909	Succeeded by Thomas J. Shahan
