= Thomas W. Powers =

American Catholic priest (born 1965)

- Born: Thomas Warren Powers; February 19, 1965 (age 61); Newtown, Connecticut, U.S.
- Education: University of Notre Dame; St. John Fisher Seminary; Pontifical North American College
- Occupations: Catholic priest Rector of the Pontifical North American College

Thomas Warren Powers (born February 19, 1965) is an American Catholic priest of the Diocese of Bridgeport in Connecticut, and the twenty-fourth rector of the Pontifical North American College in Rome.

== Biography ==
=== Early life ===
Thomas Warren Powers was raised in Newtown, Connecticut. The son of Thomas and Margaret Mary Powers, he is one of five children. He attended Immaculate High School in Danbury and went on to undergraduate studies at the University of Notre Dame. He graduated in 1987 with a Bachelor of Arts in economics and a minor in finance. After college, he worked as a financial consultant with Anderson Consulting in New York.

=== Priesthood ===
In 1992, Powers entered seminary and completed philosophical studies through St. John Fisher Seminary in Trumbull. He went on to study theology at the Pontifical North American College and obtained a bachelor's degree in Sacred Theology at the Pontifical Gregorian University and a licentiate at the John Paul II Institute when it was part of the Pontifical Lateran University. He was ordained a priest for the Diocese of Bridgeport on May 24, 1997.

After ordination, Powers served as parochial vicar at St. Theresa Parish in Trumbull from 1998 to 2001. From 2001 to 2005, he served as the spiritual director of St. John Fisher Seminary and chaplain of Trinity Catholic High School in Stamford. In 2005, he was sent to Rome to serve in the Vatican's Congregation for Bishops, during which time he served as an adjunct spiritual director for seminarians at the North American College. He was named a Chaplain of His Holiness with the title "Monsignor" in 2010. After returning to Bridgeport in 2015, he served as vicar general and moderator of the curia of the diocese. Since 2020, he has also served as pastor of St. John Parish in Darien.

=== Rector of the North American College ===
Powers' appointment as Rector of the Pontifical North American College was made public on March 30, 2022. His term began on July 1, 2022.

Preceded by Peter Harman	Rector of the North American College, Rome; 2022	Succeeded by —
