= Pontifical North American College =

Roman Catholic seminary in Rome

- Latin: Pontificium Collegium Civitatum Foederatarum Americae Septemtrionalis (lit.: 'Pontifical College of the United States of America')
- Motto: Firmum est cor meum
- Motto in English: "Steadfast is my heart"
- Type: Roman Catholic seminary; continuing formation institute, clerical residence
- Established: 8 December 1859 (167 years ago)
- Affiliations: United States Conference of Catholic Bishops; Congregation for the Clergy
- Rector: Thomas W. Powers
- Location: Rome, Italy (on property subject in part to Holy See extraterritorial jurisdiction); 41°53′51″N 12°27′33″E
- Campus: Janiculum Hill (Seminary and Casa O'Toole Continuing Formation Institute) Central Rome (Casa Santa Maria Graduate Studies Residence and Office for Pilgrims)
- Colors: Unofficially, red and blue
- Nickname: North American Martyrs
- Sporting affiliations: Clericus Cup
- Website: www.pnac.org

The Pontifical North American College (NAC) is a Catholic institution in Rome, Italy, providing housing and formation for seminarians. Founded by Pope Pius IX in 1859 to increase the number of American priests, most of the NAC seminarians come from the United States. The NAC also provides a residence for priests pursuing graduate work in Rome, and has a continuing education program for older priests.

The NAC is administered by the Holy See's Dicastery for the Clergy, which delegates its operation to the United States Conference of Catholic Bishops (USCCB). The latter acts through the NAC's episcopal board of governors.

== History ==
=== Background ===
In 1854, Cardinal Gaetono Bedini, the secretary general of the Sacred Congregation for the Propagation of the Faith wrote to Cardinal Giacomo Antonelli expressing concern about American Catholics, most of whom were European immigrants. Bedini feared that many immigrants would leave the church due to strong anti-Catholic sentiment in the United States, plus aggressive evangelization by Protestant sects. He believed that these Catholics needed more priests to provide this increasing Catholic population with support and education. However, Bedini felt that priests brought in from Europe would only cause more tensions.

Bedini's solution was to create a North American seminary in Rome, funded by American bishops, to train American priests. The plan faced opposition from some American bishops as well as from officials in the Roman Curia. However, Pope Pius IX, a Bedini ally, agreed with the plan and ordered its implementation.

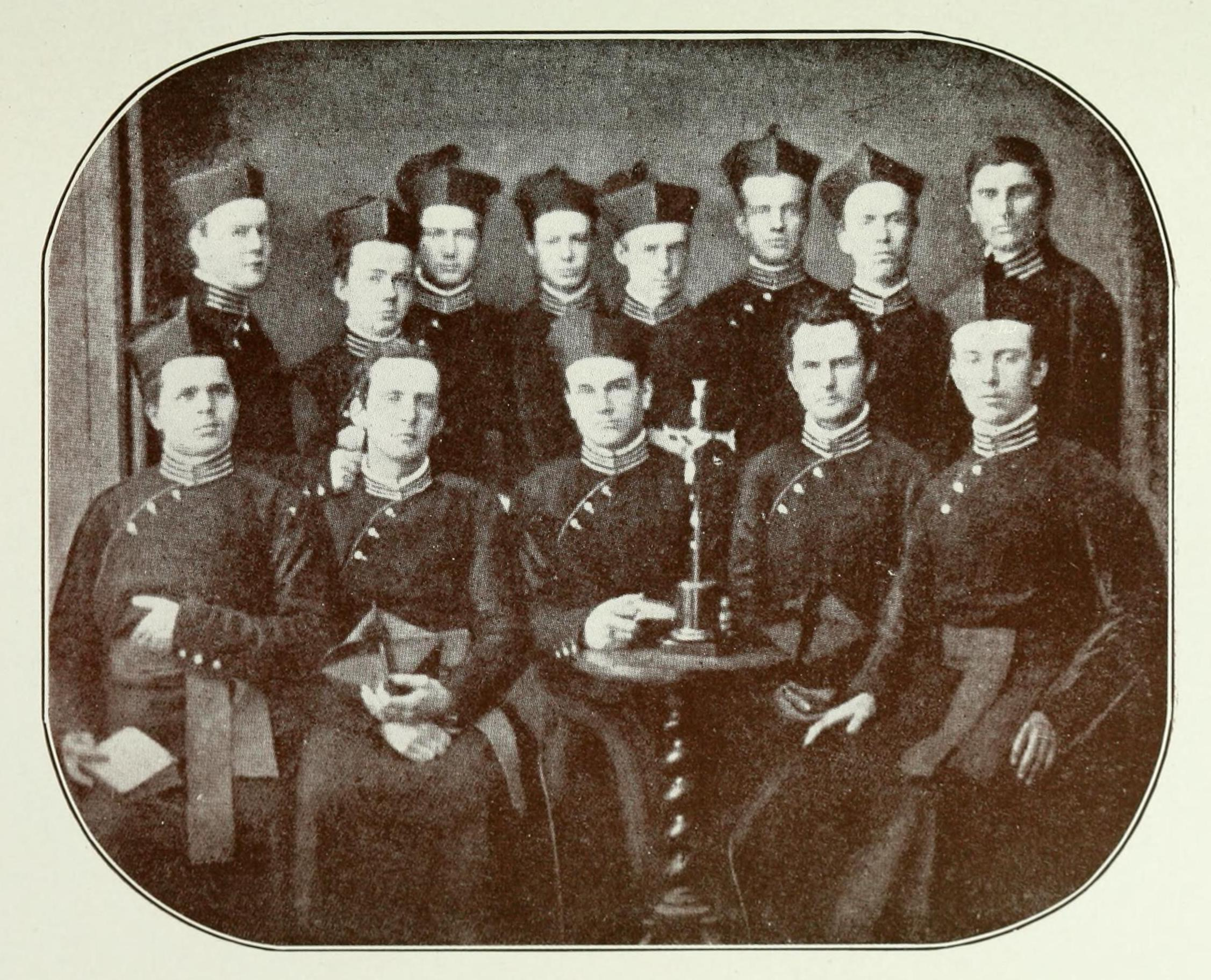
First Class of the Pontifical North American College, circa 1860

=== 19th century ===
The North American College seminary was founded in 1859 by Pope Pius IX. He located the new seminary in a former Dominican and Visitation convent on the Via dell'Umiltà, near the Trevi Fountain.The NAC was opened ceremonially on 8 December 1859, and received a formal visit from the pope on 29 January 1860. This original campus, still owned by the NAC, is called the Casa Santa Maria. The NAC was granted status as a pontifical university by Pope Leo XIII in 1884.

The NAC was incorporated in the United States by a special act of the Maryland General Assembly in 1886 as a non-stock (not-for-profit) corporation under the name "The American College of the Roman Catholic Church of the United States." This is its official name for the purposes of United States federal and state law, and for such things as contributions and bequests. The NAC is exempt from United States federal taxation, and contributions to it are tax deductible under U.S. federal tax law.

=== 20th century ===
On 14 February 1929, the American bishops purchased the Villa Gabrielli al Gianicolo, an estate on the Janiculum Hill in the western part of Rome, overlooking the Vatican. Their intent was to eventually build dormitories for their seminarians there. On 11 September 1933, Bishop Ralph Hayes of the Diocese of Helena in Montana became the first American bishop to be appointed rector of the NAC. He succeeded Reverend Eugene Burke, who had served as rector for 10 years. Hayes would serve as rector until 1940, when Pope Pius XII closed the NAC due to World War II.

In 1948, with the war over, the Holy See announced the reopening of the NAC. In August 1948, fifty American seminarians traveled to Italy to begin their studies at the Casa Santa Maria campus. The board of governors had appointed Bishop Martin J. O'Connor from the Diocese of Scranton in 1946 to be the new rector. O'Connor would serve as rector until 1964.

Before the war, the seminarians resided at the Casa Santa Maria campus in central Rome. After the war ended, the American bishops decided that the existing seminary was too small for their increased needs. More American men wanted to join the priesthood and the bishops wanted to send more of them to study in Rome. In response, the American bishops authorized construction of a new $3 million seminary on the Villa Gabriella property that they had purchased in 1929. On 14 October 1953, Pope Pius XII dedicated the newly built NAC seminary.The bishops converted the old Casa Santa Maria campus into a residence for American priests studying in Rome.

=== 21st century ===
In 2009 and 2010, NAC renovated an 18th-century residence on the Villa Gabrielli property, naming it Casa O'Toole. It became the home for the NAC's Institute for Continuing Theological Education, a continuing formation program for priests ordained for ten years or more. In addition, NAC built a new convent there for the religious sisters who make up part of the NAC staff. In January 2015, the NAC opened a new 10-story tower on the main Janiculum Hill building, funded by donations from a couple in Oklahoma. The new construction houses classrooms, gathering space, liturgical practice chapels, and administrative offices.

On 23 November 2015, the Congregation for the Clergy announced the appointment of Peter Harman of Springfield, Illinois, to succeed James F. Checchio as the NAC rector, effective on 1 February 2016. On 23 March 2020, in response to the COVID-19 pandemic, the NAC decided to send all of its remaining seminarians home.

In 2021, Anthony Gorgia, a former seminarian, filed a lawsuit against the NAC, its leadership, and the Archdiocese of New York. Gorgia claimed that the defendants pressured him to resign in 2019 from the seminary because he had witnessed sexual activity there by a bishop and several priests. In response, NAC says it was not informed of any misconduct, and said that it would defend itself "vigorously" against the allegations. On 18 January 2022, a judge in New York City dismissed the lawsuit, saying that the court did not have jurisdiction over the college and its employees in Rome.

On 30 March 2022, the NAC announced that Monsignor Thomas W. Powers would succeed Harman as NAC rector, effective July 2022. The NAC board of governors and the papal Congregation for the Clergy had been deadlocked for several months over a successor to Harman. It was seen as part of a wider conflict between the Holy See and the US Conference of Catholic Bishops, which was responsible for electing the board of governors. In the end, the Congregation of the Clergy consulted directly with the metropolitan archbishops in the United States, resulting in Powers's appointment.

== Description ==
=== Departments ===
The NAC has four departments:

- A seminary that houses and forms candidates for the priesthood
- The Casa Santa Maria, a residence for Catholic priests pursuing graduate studies in Rome
- The Institute for Continuing Theological Education, located in the Casa O'Toole on the grounds of the seminary
- The Bishops' Office for U.S. Visitors to the Vatican, which serves Americans staying in Rome. These include pilgrims, college students, and clergy, especially clergy with the United States Conference of Catholic Bishops (USCCB).

The college has welcomed many visitors, including four popes, two presidents of the United States (Dwight D. Eisenhower and John F. Kennedy), and the evangelist Billy Graham.

The NAC board of governors consists of one diocesan or auxiliary bishop from each of the fifteen regions of the USCCB. As of 2026, the chair of the NAC board of governors and president was Bishop Austin Vetter of the Diocese of Helena in Montana.

=== Enrollment ===
For the 2014–2015 academic year, enrollment in the NAC seminary was approximately 250, at the Casa Santa Maria, approximately 75; and at each of several continuing formation sessions, approximately 30.

Enrollment in the college is available to properly qualified Catholic seminarians and priests who are studying for a diocese in the United States, nominated for such enrollment by a diocesan bishop of the United States, and approved for enrollment by the Rector. Enrollment of students who are studying for non-American dioceses or who are not American citizens is by decision of the board. At present, a number of Australian seminarians are enrolled in the Seminary Division, and several priests of non-United States nationality are resident at the Casa Santa Maria or are enrolled in the college's continuing formation program. For their academic formation, the students of all departments may, as approved by their bishop and the Board of Governors, attend any pontifical university or other educational institution approved by the Holy See. Human, pastoral, and spiritual formation is provided by the faculty of the college.

== Rectors ==
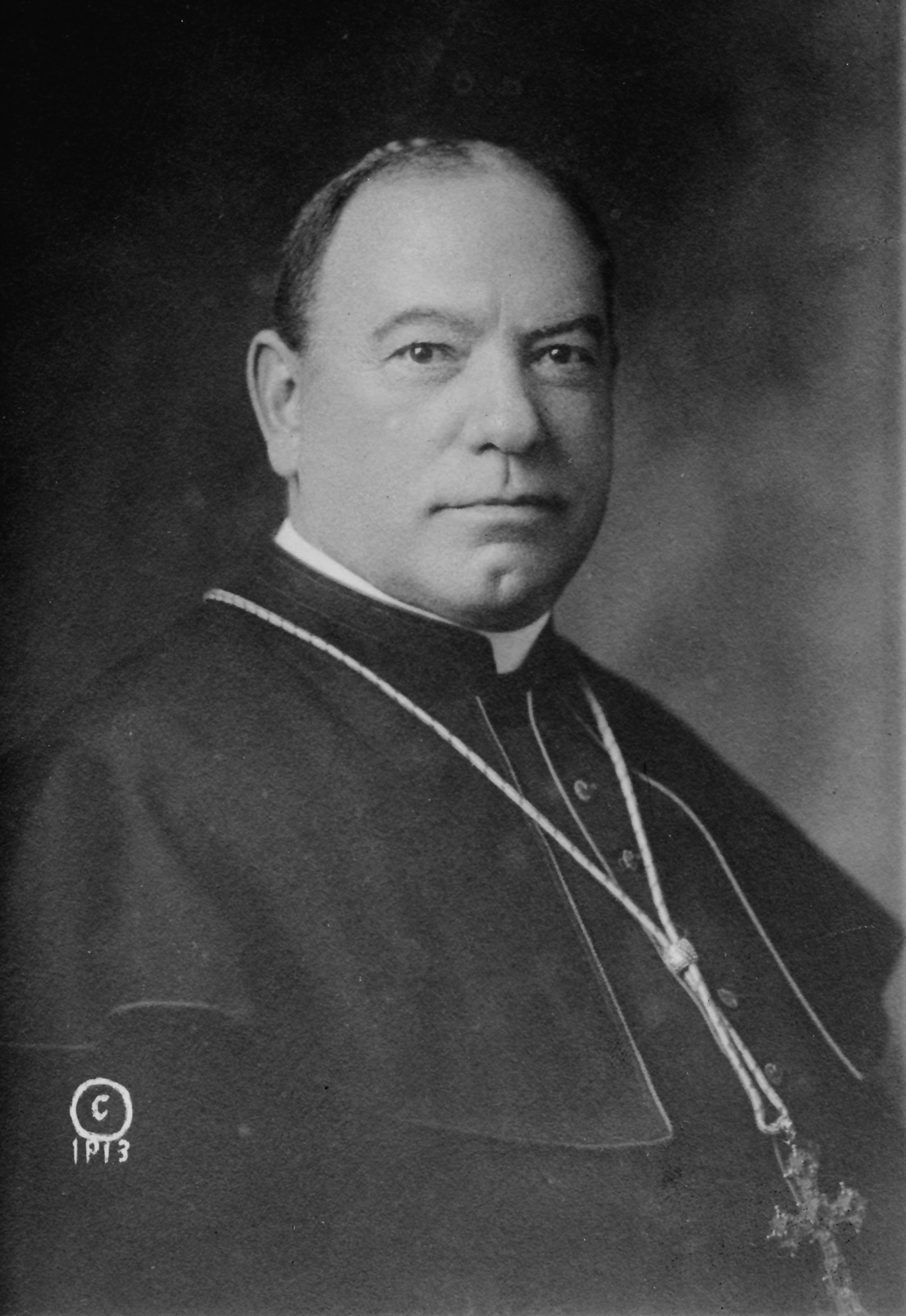
William O'Connell was the seventh rector of the college, from 1895 to 1901.

| No. | Name | Years served |
|---|---|---|
| 1. | Dom Bernard Smith, O.S.B. (temporary) | 1859–1860 |
| 2. | Fr. William G. McCloskey | 1860–1868 |
| 3. | Fr. Francis S. M. Chatard | 1868–1878 |
| 4. | Msgr. Louis Hostelot | 1878–1884 |
| 5. | Fr. Augustine J. Schulte (temporary) | 1884–1885 |
| 6. | Fr. Denis J. O'Connell | 1885–1895 |
| 7. | Fr. William H. O'Connell | 1895–1901 |
| 8. | Archbishop Thomas F. Kennedy | 1901–1917 |
| 9. | Msgr. Charles O'Hern | 1917–1925 |
| 10. | Msgr. Eugene S. Burke | 1925–1935 |
| 11. | Bishop Ralph L. Hayes | 1935–1944 |
| 12. | Fr. James Gerald Kealy | 1945–1946 |
| 13. | Archbishop Martin J. O'Connor | 1946–1964 |
| 14. | Bishop Francis F. Reh | 1964–1968 |
| 15. | Bishop James A. Hickey | 1969–1974 |
| 16. | Msgr. Harold P. Darcy | 1974–1979 |
| 17. | Msgr. Charles M. Murphy | 1979–1984 |
| 18. | Msgr. Lawrence M. Purcell | 1984–1990 |
| 19. | Msgr. Edwin F. O'Brien | 1990–1994 |
| 20. | Msgr. Timothy M. Dolan | 1994–2001 |
| 21. | Msgr. Kevin C. McCoy | 2001–2005 |
| 22. | Msgr. James F. Checchio | 2005–2016 |
| 23. | Fr. Peter C. Harman | 2016–2022 |
| 24. | Msgr. Thomas W. Powers | 2022-current |

== Activities ==
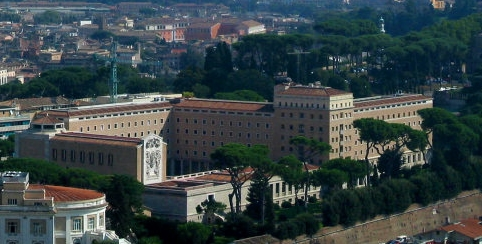
View of the Janiculum campus of the North American College from the cupola of Saint Peter's Basilica in Vatican City

In addition to their academic and pastoral activities, the students at the college participate in athletic competitions with students from other Roman ecclesiastical institutions. Since 2007, the college has competed in an annual soccer tournament among Roman Colleges, called the Clericus Cup. The college's team, nicknamed the "North American Martyrs", won the championship in 2012, 2013 and 2018 and was runner-up in 2009 and 2010.

== See also ==
- American College of the Immaculate Conception
- List of alumni of the Pontifical North American College
