= Charles M. Murphy (priest) =

American Roman Catholic priest

Charles M. Murphy is an American Roman Catholic priest of the Diocese of Portland, Maine. Monsignor Murphy formerly served as the academic dean and rector of the Pontifical North American College in Rome from 1979 to 1984.

Murphy earned a doctorate in sacred theology from the Pontifical Gregorian University and a master's degree in education from Harvard University. He graduated with a bachelor's degree in classics from the College of the Holy Cross in 1957.

== Publications ==
- Belonging to God: A Personal Training

Academic offices
Preceded by Harold P. Darcy	Rector of the North American College; 1979–1984	Succeeded by Lawrence M. Purcell
