= Casa Santa Maria =

Catholic residence in Rome, Italy

Coordinates: 41°53′58″N 12°28′59″E

The Casa Santa Maria (in full, Casa Santa Maria dell'Umiltà) is a residence in Rome, Italy that serves English-speaking priests who are sent by their dioceses for graduate level studies in the city. It is a part of the Pontifical North American College, and served as its main campus from its founding in 1859 until the construction of a new campus on the Janiculum Hill in 1953. It also houses the Bishops' Office for United States Visitors to the Vatican.

== Site and architecture ==
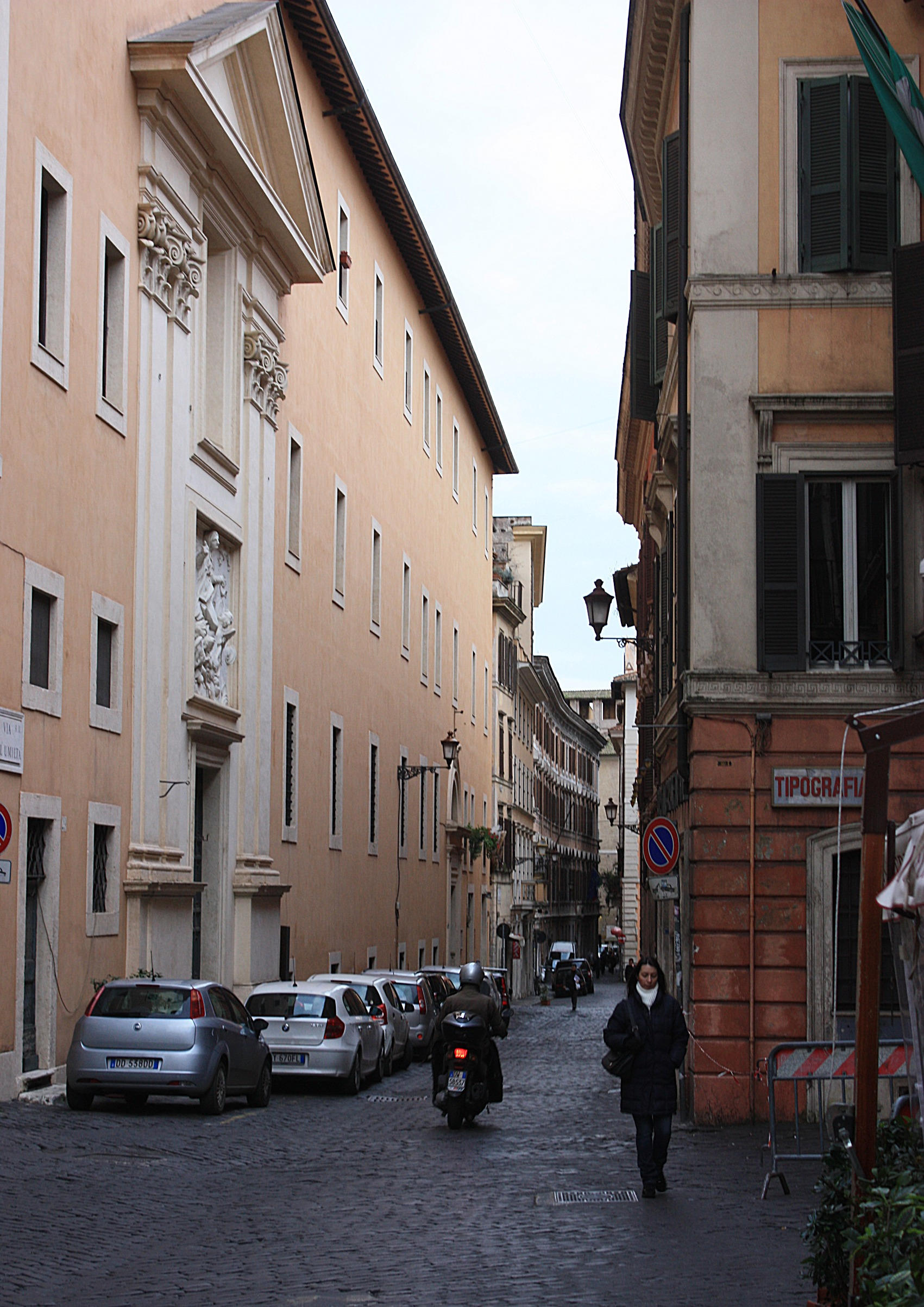
The facade of the Church of Our Lady of Humility is seen on the left of this view down the Via dell'Umiltà.

The buildings that currently make up the Pontifical North American College's Casa Santa Maria encompass a large area, trapezoidal in shape, giving on to the Via dell'Umiltà, the Via dell'Archetto, the Vicolo del Monticello, and the Piazza della Pilotta. At first glance the buildings seem to be one single construction, but they are not; their external coherency is only the result of a fairly recent restructuring. To found the monastery that was originally housed on the site, multiple houses were purchased along the Via dell'Archetto. After the 1607 foundation date, additions to the property were made in 1641, 1681, and 1737. American College historian Robert McNamara describes the complex in 1859 as "a large building, rangy and haphazard in form, making no claim to distinction in style, but combining under one roof quarters easily adaptable to housing a hundred or more young seminarians."

Henry Brann, a historian of the American College, describes the building in the following terms (writing in 1910):

The building itself is of the ordinary Roman style, simple and unadorned, but solid and substantial, and with no attempt at external ornamentation. The plain exterior of buff color would give no idea of the use which it serves, were it not for the facade of the church adjoining. The interior is that which is usual in a convent, college, or monastery, with floors of tiling or brick. [...] In the beautiful garden attached to the College are many rare plants and a number of orange trees. Along the base of its walls lie fragments of columns, broken inscriptions, friezes, and excavated forms, which excite the curiosity of the archaeologist, and may contain interesting information for him.

== History ==
=== Ancient Roman background ===
In ancient Roman times, the area in which the Casa Santa Maria is located was considered to be on a spur of the Quirinal Hill called the Mucialis. In the Middle Ages, before the construction of the church and convent that would eventually come to house the American College's seat in Rome, the area was covered with a complex of large Roman ruins popularly called the "Prison of Virgil." In all likelihood, these would have been the remains of what modern archaeology has identified as the Quirinal Serapeum. Excavation works in 1947 revealed Roman ruins under the College chapel, but they cannot be authoritatively identified as belonging to the Serapeum; instead, they may be part of the Campus Agrippae or the Statio I Cohortium Vigilum.

=== From the Middle Ages to monastic foundation ===
By the Middle Ages the Roman structures mentioned above had fallen into decay. Nevertheless, before the founding of the monastery that would eventually become the Casa Santa Maria, a number of noble families moved into the area. One of these were the Orsini, from which the foundress of the monastery, Francesca Baglioni Orsini (c. 1540–1625) was descended. When her husband Francesco Orsini died in 1593, she refused to marry again. She returned to her native Rome from Florence, where she had worked as a governess of the princesses Eleanora and Maria de' Medici, and founded a monastery in which to live out the rest of her years. For that purpose, she purchased a block of buildings from Vincenzo Menichelli, "Cavaliere Romano," for the sum of 6,500 scudi, and named it the Monastero dell'Umiltà (Monastery of Humility). The convent's foundation was approved by Pope Paul V with the brief Inter universa of November 20, 1607. The cloister was solemnly dedicated and blessed on September 26, 1613. The convent took its first sisters from Dominican convents on the Quirinal, and the Rule of Saint Dominic was adopted for the house. All of the nuns of the Umiltà monastery were to be of noble background. The foundress lived in rooms of her own, was not obliged by the rule, and did not wear the habit; nevertheless her contemporaries remarked on her virtue and holiness before her death in 1625. An inscription marking the room in which she died is still present in the Casa Santa Maria today.

=== Upheaval in the 19th century ===
The Dominican sisters of the Umiltà maintained their convent for centuries, and were favorably noted for the strict observance of their rule. However, their tenure of the property was to come to an end as a result of Napoleon's campaigns in Italy. Although untouched during the invasion of Rome in 1798 and the temporary establishment of the Roman Republic, the eventual annexation of the Papal States to the French Empire led to the suppression of all convents and monasteries in the city on May 3, 1810. The house was taken over by the French government and the nuns evicted; while they sought refuge in other monasteries or left religious life, the convent was turned into a barracks for policemen. The return of Pope Pius VII to the city in 1814 meant the restoration of many convents in the city, but the Umiltà sisters were never able to return to their home and the monastery became extinct.

In turn, the convent was granted to the Visitation Sisters on August 14, 1814. They made some immediate changes to the monastery chapel, including installing an image of Our Lady of Guadalupe by Miguel Cabrera which had been gifted to them by Pope Benedict XIV in the mid 1700s. It remains in the chapel to this day. During the time of the Visitation sisters, the monastery was often visited by Don Vincenzo Pallotti, a future canonized saint. Just thirty five years after acquiring the property, however, the Visitandines were forced to leave their new home by compulsion of the revolutionary Roman Republic in 1849. On June 5, a commissar of the Republic appeared at the convent at six in the evening, informed the superior that the house was to be taken over, and the sisters were forced to leave within six hours. The complex was once again turned into a barracks, this time for the occupying French army that drove out the Republic. It remained in that use until 1854.

=== American College in Rome ===
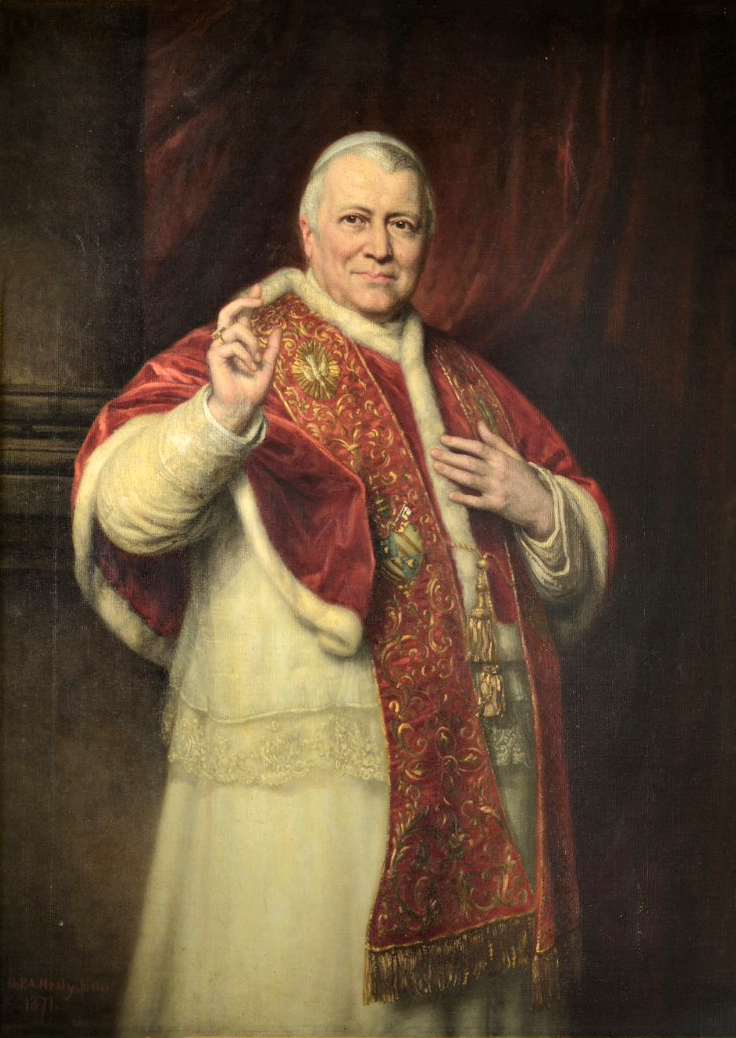
Pope Pius IX, who used to serve Mass there as a boy, ensured that the American College received the Casa Santa Maria property in 1859.

The old Visitation monastery passed into the hands of the American College thanks to the express will of Pope Pius IX, who used to serve Mass there for the Visitation sisters as a young boy. While other Colleges had been vying for its convenient location and spacious property, Pope Pius ensured that it would be given to the American College, whose founding had been a project of his own initiative. He even personally contributed the money to purchase the property. The new College was opened ceremonially on December 8, 1859, and the new foundation received a formal visit from the pope on January 29, 1860.

The structure served as the main seat of the American College in Rome for almost a century. (Note: For many decades, the actual owner of the property was the Propaganda Fide. This led to problems after the end of the Papal States in 1870, when the College property was almost confiscated by the Kingdom of Italy; however, thanks to intervention from the United States government that was avoided. Only as late as 1948 did the title of the property properly pass to the Bishops of the United States.) This changed as a result of the situation developing in Europe in 1940, when the American seminarians were forced to depart en masse on May 31 of that year. In the end, they had to complete their studies at various seminaries back in the United States. The property, while remaining in the possession of the bishops of the United States, was requisitioned for "charitable wartime employment" in 1943. Until mid-1947, it served as a home for displaced Italian children. Later that year, the property was returned to the use of the American College. Under the direction of Martin J. O'Connor, Rector of the College, a general restoration of the whole complex was begun. With the construction of a new and larger campus at Villa Gabrielli on the Janiculum, the buildings on Via dell'Umiltà were rechristened the "Casa Santa Maria," and set aside for the use of priests pursuing graduate studies at universities in Rome. That continues to be its primary function today.

The history and devotional practices of the Dominican and Visitation nuns that once inhabited the building have affected the life of the American College. For example, a devotion to Our Lady of Humility has been adopted as the College's own, and certain privileged feasts of the nuns, such as the Visitandines' celebration of St. Francis de Sales, were always celebrated with special solemnity by the College as well. Another example relates to the fact that the declaration as Venerable (an early step in the process of canonization) of the Visitandine nun, later saint, Margaret Mary Alacoque, occurred in the Church of the Umiltà in 1846. In recognition of that connection, Henry Brann was able to claim in 1910 that the American College was "inseparably associated with the devotion of the Sacred Heart of Jesus".

== Chapel of Our Lady of Humility ==
The American College's chapel, the full name of which is Santa Maria Assunta al monastero dell’Umiltà ("Saint Mary of the Assumption at Humility Monastery"), was originally the church attached to the monastery founded by Francesca Baglioni Orsini. The cornerstone was laid on March 7, 1601. The original church, which was finished about a decade later, was entirely rebuilt between 1641 and 1646 and it is that second structure that rises on the site today. The architect was Paolo Maruscelli, a Florentine. Although some details of its decoration have changed throughout the centuries, "the victim of later, more elaborate and flamboyant tastes," the architectural plan and basic structure remain the same today. A notable later addition is the highly ornate carved wooden organ loft, the work of Sebastiano Moroni in 1735.

The church is vaulted, and lighted by four windows above a large cornice. That cornice, in turn, is supported by twelve pilasters, six on a side. There are four chapels in the church in addition to the main tribune. The main altar houses a tabernacle made from sardonyx agate, over which used to be placed an image of Our Lady of Humility by Pietro Perugino. That image, however, was lost sometime before 1814. When the chapel was transferred to the newly-formed American College, Archbishop Gaetano Bedini substituted it with a copy of the image of Our Lady of Mercy that is venerated in Rimini. (Note: Even though the image is not the original "Our Lady of Humility," the seminarians of the American College continue to venerate the image under that title.) This image is enclosed in an amethyst frame surrounded by a bas relief of four angels in gilded bronze. Two angels in white marble support the frame. The whole main altar was the work of Martino Longhi the Younger, who completed the work between 1643 and 1646. Sometime around 1859, it was moved away from the wall and raised to a higher level. Between the pilasters are six stucco statues of female saints: Cecilia, Catherine, Barbara, Agatha, Ursula, and Agnes. These statues are the work of Antonio Raggi and were sculpted and put in place between 1663 and 1674.

The church's exterior facade is said to be the work of Carlo Fontana, even if that cannot be established for certain. In any case, it no longer appears today as it did at the time of its completion. When the monastery was handed over to the Americans by Pope Pius IX, the architect Andrea Busiri built a storey above the church, which altered the facade by substituting a Neoclassical pediment in place of Fontana's Baroque one.

Extensive restoration work was completed on the church in 1947, when the property was returned to the use of the American College following World War II. Notable improvements to the chapel included a new marble floor executed in the color rosso di Francia, cleaning of the frescoes in the vault, and retouching of the stucco figures around the sanctuary.

== The Casa S. Maria today ==
=== Graduate house of the Pontifical North American College ===
As home to the graduate department of the Pontifical North American College, the Casa Santa Maria provides a residence and community for priests pursuing graduate studies at a variety of universities, institutes, and academic programs in the city of Rome. In 2015, the Casa housed seventy-two student priests, representative of forty-two dioceses in the United States and other English-speaking countries. The previous superior of the house was Monsignor Ferdinando Berardi of the Archdiocese of New York.

The current superior of Casa Santa Maria is the Msgr. William Millea of the Diocese of Bridgeport.

=== Bishops' Office for United States Visitors to the Vatican ===
The Visitors' Office at the Casa Santa Maria is an initiative sponsored jointly by both the North American College and the United States Conference of Catholic Bishops, and staffed by the Religious Sisters of Mercy of Alma, Michigan. The Office exists to assist pilgrims from the United States in planning a journey to Rome, assisting with requests for papal audience tickets, tours of the catacombs and the Vatican Necropolis, and requests for papal blessings.

== References and notes ==
Notes

Works cited

- Brann, Henry A. (1910), History of the American College of the Roman Catholic Church of the United States, Rome, Italy, New York, Cincinnati, Chicago: Benziger Brothers
- Cicinelli, Aldo (1970), "The Church of S. Maria dell'Umiltà and the Chapel of the North American College", Guide di Roma Illustrate, translated by Daniel P. Daley, Rome: Marietti
- McNamara, Robert F. (1956), The American College in Rome, 1855–1955, Rochester, N.Y.: The Christopher Press, LCCN 56007591
