= Peter Harman =

Catholic priest and Rector of the Pontifical North American College

Peter C. Harman (born 1973) is a Catholic priest of the Diocese of Springfield in Illinois, who served as the twenty-third rector of the Pontifical North American College in Rome from February 2016 to June 2022.

== Biography ==
Peter Harman was born in Quincy, Illinois, where he attended Quincy Notre Dame High School. He completed philosophical studies in preparation for the priesthood at Saint Meinrad College Seminary, and in 1995 began theological studies at the Pontifical North American College in Rome. He was ordained a priest by Bishop Daniel L. Ryan on July 17, 1999, after which he returned to Rome to complete his licentiate in moral theology at the Alphonsianum.

Upon returning from studies in Rome, Father Harman's first assignment was at Springfield's Cathedral of the Immaculate Conception. He would eventually serve as rector of the cathedral parish for five years, notably overseeing a complete restoration of the structure from 2008 to 2009. Other assignments in the Diocese of Springfield included a teaching position at Ursuline Academy and two years at St. Agnes Parish in Springfield.

Harman later continued his studies, earning a Doctor of Sacred Theology at the Catholic University of America in 2010. The topic of his dissertation was Towards a Theology of Suffering: The Contribution of Karol Wojtyła / Pope John Paul II. In 2013, he returned to Rome to serve on the faculty of his alma mater, the North American College. There, he also served as director of media relations for the College and adjunct instructor in theology at the Pontifical Gregorian University.

=== Rector of the North American College ===
On November 23, 2015, the Holy See's Congregation for the Clergy announced that Harman had been selected to succeed Monsignor James F. Checchio as the twenty-third rector of the Pontifical North American College. The Congregation had confirmed his recommendation by the College's fifteen-member board of directors, and the appointment took effect on February 1, 2016. He was formally installed in office on February 28, 2016, during a Mass presided over by the Archbishop John J. Myers of Newark, New Jersey, Chair of the Board of Governors of the College.

It was announced that he would end his term as rector on January 31, 2022, but later his term was extended until June of that year.

In July 2022 Harman returned to the Diocese of Springfield where he was assigned as pastor of St. Anthony Parish in Effingham.

Preceded by James F. Checchio	Rector of the North American College, Rome; 2016–present	Succeeded by Thomas W. Powers
