= Kevin McCoy (priest) =

American priest

Kevin C. McCoy (born 1954) is an American Roman Catholic priest.

He was born at Jefferson, Iowa on April 24, 1954. McCoy attended Loras College in Dubuque, IA as well as the North American College in Rome. He was ordained July 25, 1981 in Jefferson, IA. He was Chancellor of the Diocese of Sioux City from 1987 to 1998 and was named Monsignor in 1998. McCoy served as the rector of the Pontifical North American College in Rome from 2001 until 2005, when he was selected as head of the capital campaign for that college in Washington, D.C.

Academic offices
Preceded by Timothy M. Dolan	Rector of the Pontifical North American College; 2001-2005	Succeeded by James F. Checchio
